= List of flag bearers for Sri Lanka at the Olympics =

Sri Lanka at the Olympics
- IOC code: SRI
- NOC: National Olympic Committee of Sri Lanka
- Website: www.srilankaolympic.org
- Medals: Gold 0 Silver 2 Bronze 0 Total 2

Summer appearances
- 1948; 1952; 1956; 1960; 1964; 1968; 1972; 1976; 1980; 1984; 1988; 1992; 1996; 2000; 2004; 2008; 2012; 2016; 2020; 2024

This is a list of flag bearers who have represented Ceylon and Sri Lanka at the Olympics.

Flag bearers carry the national flag of their country at the opening ceremony of the Olympic Games.

#	Event year	Season	Flag bearer	Sport
1	1948	Summer	Duncan White	Athletics
2	1952	Summer		
3	1956	Summer		
4	1960	Summer		
5	1964	Summer		
6	1968	Summer		
7	1972	Summer	Lucien Rosa	Athletics
8	1980	Summer		
9	1984	Summer	Lalin Jirasinha	Sailing
10	1988	Summer	Daya Rajasinghe Nadarajasingham	Shooting
11	1992	Summer		
12	1996	Summer	Sriyani Kulawansa	Athletics
13	2000	Summer	Damayanthi Dharsha	Athletics
14	2004	Summer	Susanthika Jayasinghe	Athletics
15	2008	Summer	Susanthika Jayasinghe	Athletics
16	2012	Summer	Niluka Karunaratne	Badminton
17	2016	Summer	Anuradha Cooray	Athletics
18	2020	Summer	Chamara Repiyallage	Judo
18	2020	Summer	Milka Gehani	Gymnastics
19	2024	Summer	Dilhani Lekamge	Athletics
19	2024	Summer	Viren Nettasinghe	Badminton

== See also ==
- Sri Lanka at the Olympics
