= Sri Lanka at the 2012 Summer Olympics =

- Flag of Sri Lanka
- IOC code: SRI
- NOC: National Olympic Committee of Sri Lanka
- Website: www.srilankaolympic.org

in London
- Competitors: 7 in 4 sports
- Flag bearers: Niluka Karunaratne (opening and closing ceremonies)
- Medals: Gold 0 Silver 0 Bronze 0 Total 0

Summer Olympics appearances (overview)
- 1948; 1952; 1956; 1960; 1964; 1968; 1972; 1976; 1980; 1984; 1988; 1992; 1996; 2000; 2004; 2008; 2012; 2016; 2020; 2024

Sri Lanka participated at the 2012 Summer Olympics in London, which was held from 27 July to 12 August 2012. The country's participation at London marked its sixteenth appearance in the Summer Olympics since its debut at the 1948 Summer Olympics, having missed only the 1976 Games. The delegation consisted of seven competitors: two athletics competitors (Anuradha Cooray and Christine Merrill), two badminton players (Niluka Karunaratne and Thilini Jayasinghe) one shooter (Mangala Samarakoon) and two short-distance swimmers (Heshan Unamboowe and Reshika Udugampola). Cooray, Samarakoon and Karunaratne qualified for the Games by meeting their respective qualifying standards; the remainder of the team entered through wildcard or quota places. Karunarante was the flag bearer for the opening and closing ceremonies.

Cooray finished 55th in the men's marathon and Merrill did not advance beyond the first round of the women's 400 metres hurdles. Karunaratne defeated Japan's Kenichi Tago to advance into the elimination round of the men's badminton singles where he was eliminated from contention by Parupalli Kashyap of India. Jayasinghe was defeated by Ratchanok Intanon of Thailand and Telma Santos of Portugal in the women's badminton singles. Samarakoon entered the 10 metre air rifle and 50 metre rifle prone competitions in the qualifying round but did not score enough points to advance. Neither Unamboowe nor Udugampola, competing in the men's 100 metre backstroke and women's 100 metre freestyle, were fast enough to advance beyond their initial heats.

== Background ==
Sri Lanka participated in sixteen Olympic Games between its debut at the 1948 Summer Olympics in London, United Kingdom and the 2012 Olympic Games held in the same city. The sole exception was the 1976 Summer Olympics in Montreal. Though it was widely believed the country was participating in a boycott relating to the tour of South Africa by the New Zealand national rugby union team, it was later traced to a diplomatic mistake concerning the participation of long-distance runner Lucien Rosa. Two Sri Lankan athletes had previously won medals, both silver, for their country: hurdler Duncan White in 1948, and sprinter Susanthika Jayasinghe in 2000. Following the 2008 Summer Olympics where the country failed to achieve any medals, the Minister of Sports and Public Recreation Gamini Lokuge announced a four-year project involving major sporting competitions to find athletes for the London Games.

The London Summer Games were held from 27 July to 12 August 2012. The Sri Lankan team featured one marathon runner, a short-distance sprinter, two badminton players, one shooter and two short-distance swimmers: Anuradha Cooray in the men's marathon, Christine Merrill in the women's 400 metres hurdles, Niluka Karunaratne in the men's badminton singles, Thilini Jayasinghe in the women's badminton singles, Mangala Samarakoon in both the 10 metre air rifle and 50 metre rifle prone, Heshan Unamboowe in the men's 100 metre backstroke and Reshika Udugampola in the women's 100 metre freestyle. The seven athletes were announced by the National Olympic Committee of Sri Lanka on 12 July 2012 and the delegation was led by chef de mission Deva Henry. Other officials that attended the Games were director of sports Ranjani Jayakody, athletics and shooting manager Shemal Fernando, badminton manager Rohan de Silva, swimming manager Nishantha Piyasena and NOC representative Ranjani Jayakody. In accordance with a memorandum of understanding signed in October 2009, the team trained at Durham University's sporting facilities during the run-up to the Games. Karunarante was selected as the flag bearer for the opening and closing ceremonies.

== Athletics ==
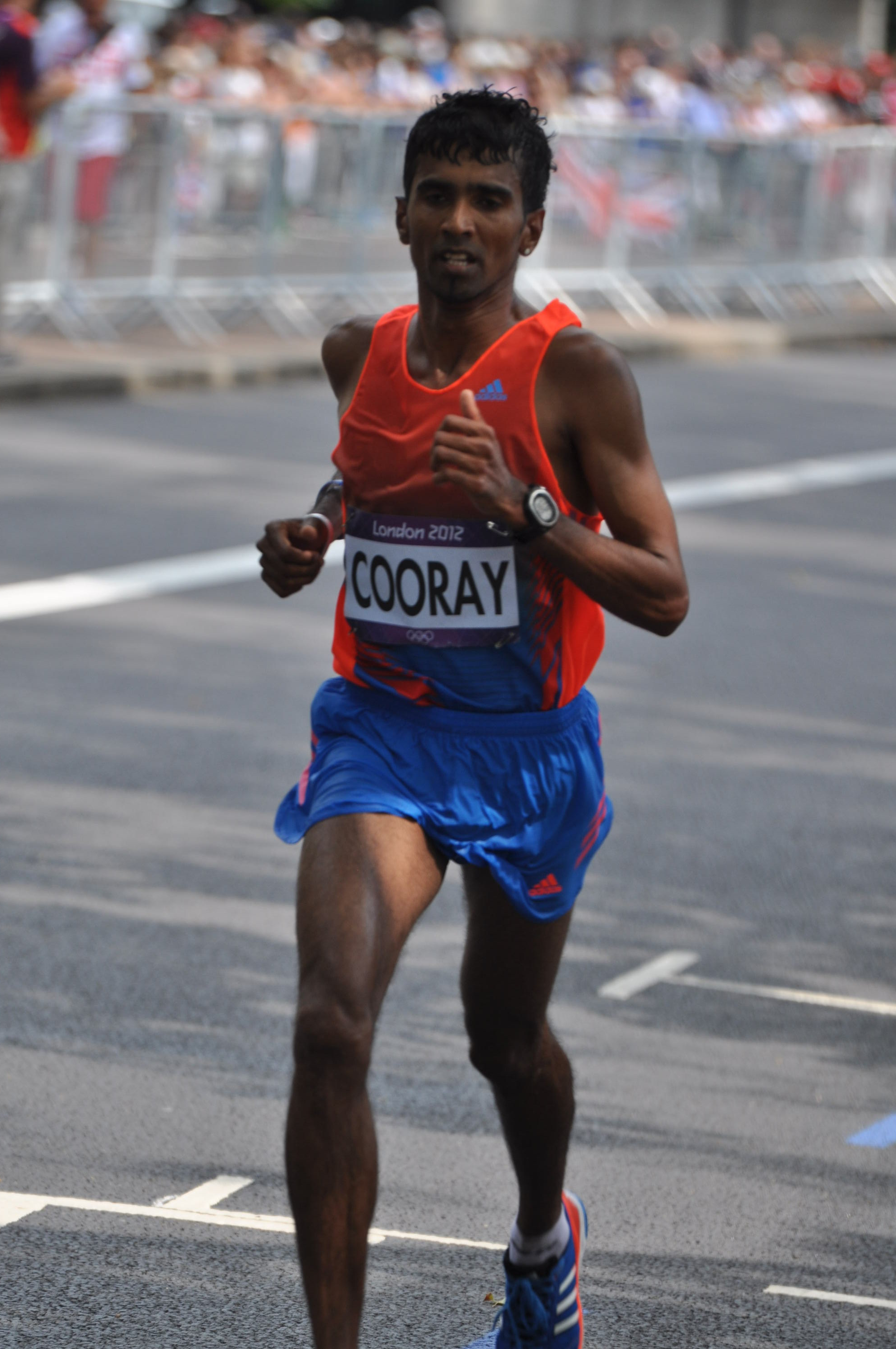
Anuradha Cooray finished 55th in the men's marathon

=== Events ===
The 2012 Summer Olympics marked Anuradha Cooray's second appearance in the Olympic Games after placing 30th at the 2004 Men's Olympic marathon. At 34, he was the oldest competitor to represent Sri Lanka at the London Summer Games. Cooray met the "B" qualification standard for the Games by recording a time of two hours, 17 minutes and 50 seconds at the 2012 London Marathon. Leading into the Olympics he trained in the English town of Aylesbury with coach Nick Taylor. In an interview with The Sunday Times before the Games, Cooray said he was aware it would be a difficult task to compete against the leading marathon runners in the world but aimed to finish in the top fifteen positions. He competed in the event on 12 August, finishing 55th out of 85 runners, (Note: Twenty athletes did not finish.) with a time of 2 hours, 20 minutes and 41 seconds. Afterwards Cooray spoke of his enjoyment of the Olympics; although he criticised the marathon course for its sharp turns, he said he was proud of his achievement.

Competing at her first Olympics at the age of 24, Christine Merrill was the sole female participant to run for Sri Lanka in athletics competition. She qualified for the women's 400 metres hurdles by using a wildcard because her personal best time of 56.83 seconds, set at the 2011 Asian Athletics Championships in Kobe, was 0.17 seconds slower than the "B" qualifying standard for her event. Before the Olympics Merrill said her target was to reach the semi-finals by pacing herself; although acknowledging the difficulty of doing so, she said she would work hard to achieve her objective. She competed in the fifth heat of the first round on 5 August, finishing ninth (and last) of all athletes, with a time of 57.15 seconds. Overall, Merrill finished 30th out of 41 runners, (Note: One athlete, Vania Stambolova, did not finish, and another, Nagihan Karadere, was disqualified.) and was 1.3 seconds slower than the slowest athlete in her heat to advance to the semi-finals. After completing her heat, she wrote on Facebook that her day was one she would not forget and thanked everyone for sharing the moment with her: "The roar of the crowd (was) so loud it made my heart echo. The bounce of the rock-hard track. The feeling of the Olympic Spirit."

Key

- Note–Ranks given for track events are within the athlete's heat only
- Q = Qualified for the next round
- N/A = Round not applicable for the event

Men

Athlete	Event	Final	
Athlete	Event	Result	Rank
Anuradha Cooray	Marathon	2:20:41	55

Women

Athlete	Event	Heat		Semifinal		Final	
Athlete	Event	Result	Rank	Result	Rank	Result	Rank
Christine Merrill	400 m hurdles	57.15	9	Did not advance			

== Badminton ==
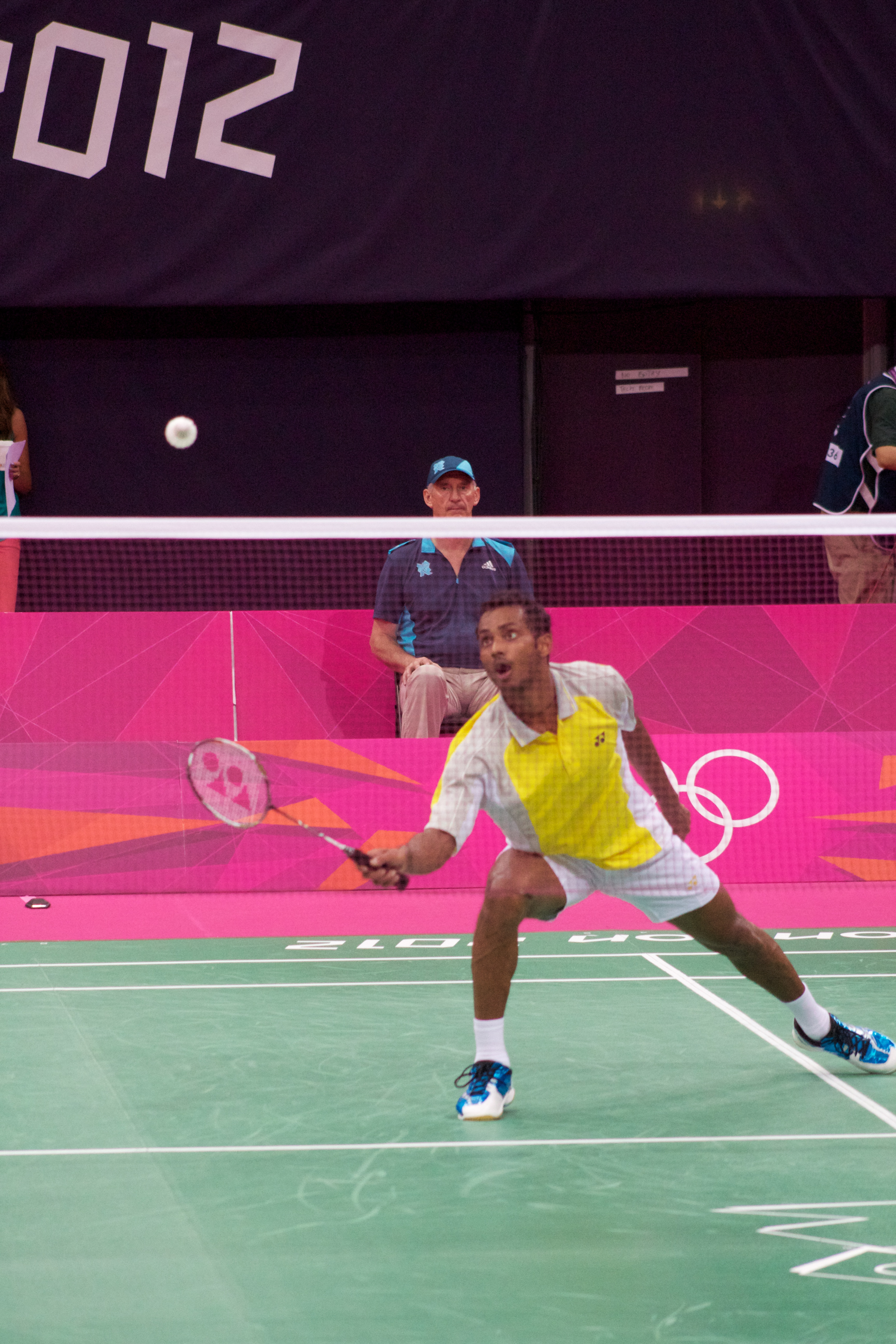
Niluka Karunaratne reached the elimination stage of the men's badminton singles before elimination.

Taking part in his first Olympic Games at the age of 27, Niluka Karunaratne was notable for carrying the Sri Lankan flag at the opening and closing ceremonies. He attained qualification for the Games due to his cumulative performance between 2 May 2011 and 29 April 2012, ranking him 47th in the Badminton World Federation standing. This allocated him a spot in the governing body's qualification list. Before the Games Karunarante stated to Daily News he would take the tournament on a match-by-match basis, and that while he was happy to represent his country, he was aware of the competitiveness of his opponents. He was drawn in Group C of the men's singles tournament on 30 July and faced world eighth-ranked Kenichi Tago of Japan. Karunaratne took advantage of Tago's slow pace and unpreparedness to win 21–18, 21–16 at the Wembley Arena. He did not progress into the quarter-finals after a defeat to India's Parupalli Kashyap 14–21, 21–15, 9–21 in a closely fought match.

Also aged 27, Thilini Jayasinghe was the oldest female athlete to compete for Sri Lanka at the London Summer Games. She had previously competed in the 2008 Summer Olympics. Jayasinghe qualified for the Games after the withdrawal of a South African badminton singles player led to a quota spot being re-allocated to Sri Lanka because of her world ranking of 109. She said before her event that she was "happy" to enter her second Olympic Games and would endeavour to reach the second round. Jayasinghe was placed in Group M of the women's singles badminton tournament on 29 July and was drawn against Ratchanok Intanon of Thailand. Inthanon made Jayasinghe vulnerable to attack and defeated the Sri Lankan player 21–13 in the first game. She continued strongly and beat Jayasinghe 21–5 in the second game to secure the victory. In her second group match against Portugal's Telma Santos, Jayasinghe was eliminated from contention from a 21-9 and 21–11 defeat.

Athlete	Event	Group Stage			Elimination	Quarterfinal	Semifinal	Final / BM	
Athlete	Event	Opposition Score	Opposition Score	Rank	Opposition Score	Opposition Score	Opposition Score	Opposition Score	Rank
Niluka Karunaratne	Men's singles	Tago (JPN); W 21–18, 21–16	—	1 Q	Kashyap (IND); L 14–21, 21–15, 9–21	Did not advance			
Thilini Jayasinghe	Women's singles	Inthanon (THA); L 13–21, 5–21	Santos (POR); L 9–21, 11–21	3	Did not advance				

== Shooting ==
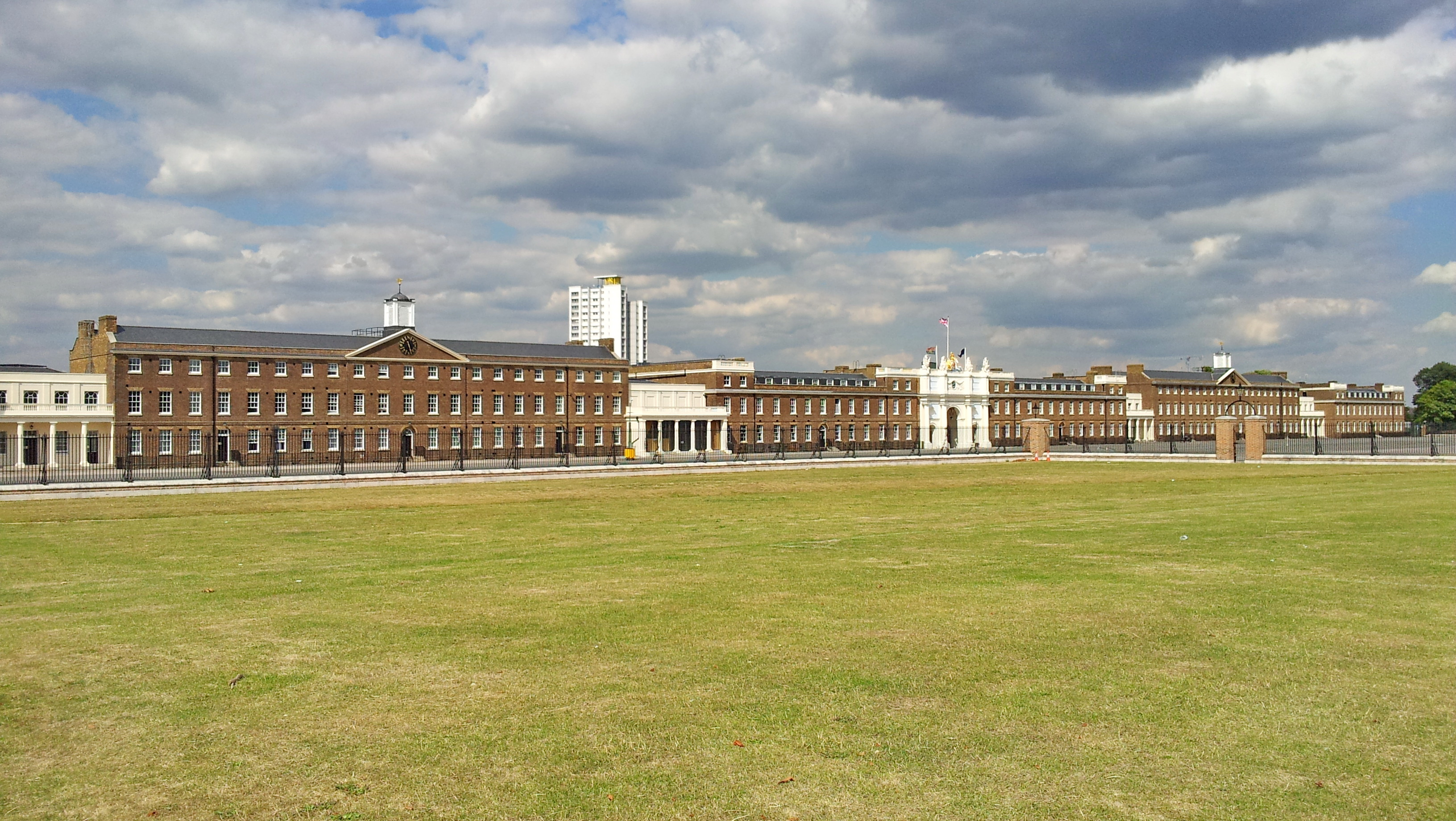
The Royal Artillery Barracks, where Samarakoon competed in two men's shooting competitions.

Mangala Samarakoon was the only member of the Sri Lankan team at the London Olympics to represent his country in shooting, and competed in the men's 10 metre air file and 50 metre rifle prone events. He entered the games using a re-allocated quota from the International Shooting Sport Federation by achieving five points more than the minimum Minimum Qualification Score of 587 points. It was also due to his status as Sri Lanka's top shooter. He spoke of his happiness at qualifying for the Olympics his objective to improve his personal best record. On 30 July Samarakoon competed in the qualification round of the men's 10 metre air rifle contest. He finished 45th out of 47 shooters with a score of 583 points. Samarakoon was eliminated from the tournament since he scored 13 points fewer than the two lowest-scoring qualifying finalists. Four days later Samarakoon participated in the men's 50 metre rifle prone qualification round. He finished 47th out of 50 athletes with a score of 585 points. Samarakoon scored ten fewer points than the lowest-scoring shooters who advanced to the final.

Men

Athlete	Event	Qualification		Final	
Athlete	Event	Points	Rank	Points	Rank
Mangala Samarakoon	10 m air rifle	583	45	Did not advance	
Mangala Samarakoon	50 m rifle prone	585	47	Did not advance	

== Swimming ==
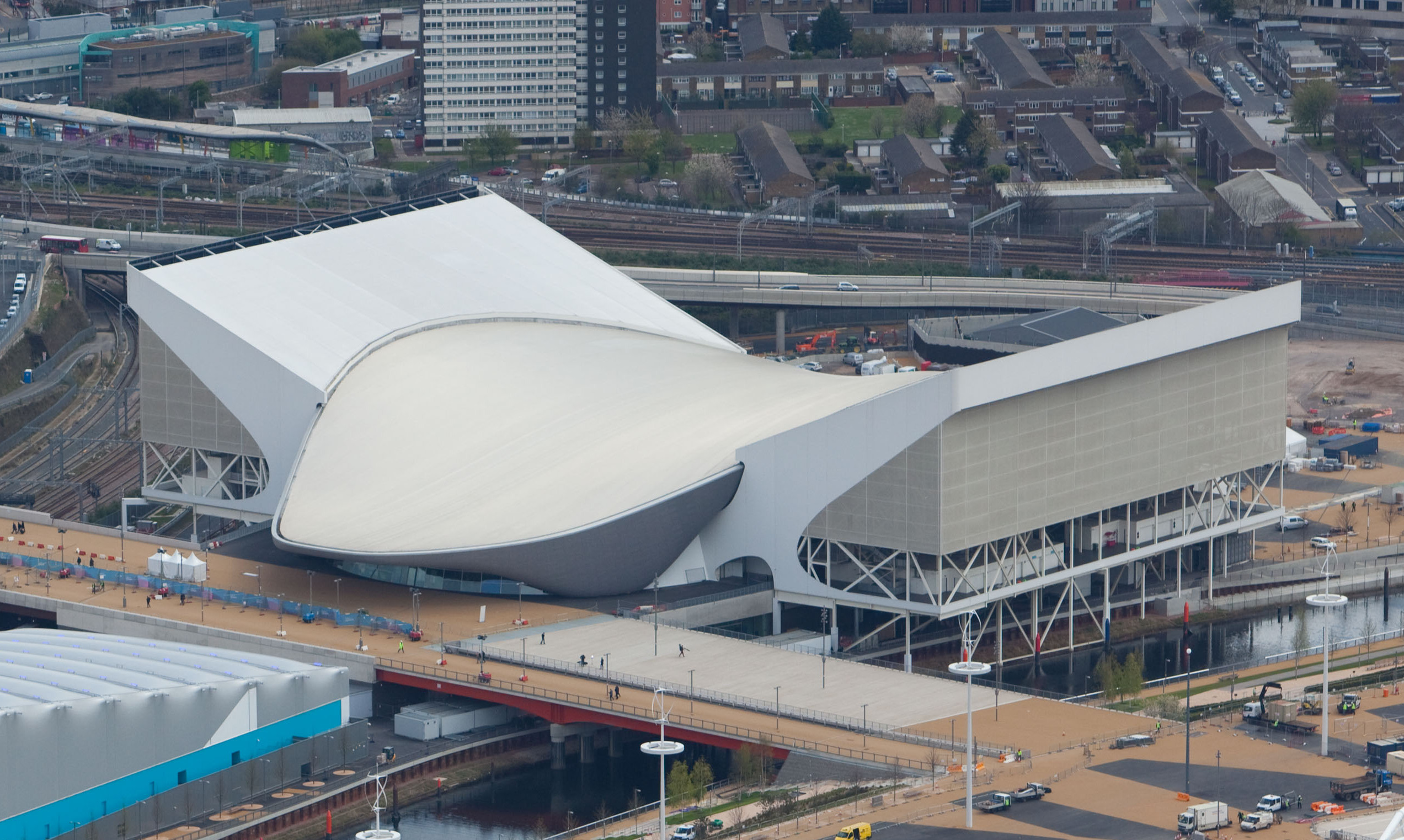
The London Aquatics Centre where Unamboowe and Udugampola competed in swimming events.

Competing in the men's 100 metre backstroke at the age of 20, Heshan Unamboowe was the youngest male athlete to compete on Sri Lanka's behalf at the London Games. He had not participated in any previous Summer Olympics. Unamboowe qualified for the games by using a universality place from the sport's governing body FINA because his fastest time of 57.47 seconds was 0.97 seconds slower than the "B" (FINA/Olympic Invitation Times) qualifying standard for his event. Unamboowe trained at Nunawading Swimming Club in Melbourne to prepare for the Olympics. Before the Games he said he was feeling "excited" but "nervous" and wanted to record a new personal best time: "As a kid I used to watch all these world class swimmers at past Olympics games and I knew I could do something special, and now my dream has come true." Unamboowe was drawn in the first heat on 29 July, and finished second out of three swimmers with a time of 57.94 seconds. He finished 42nd out of 43 competitors overall, and was 3.42 seconds slower than the slowest swimmer to make the semi-final. After his participation ended, he spoke of a pre-existing shoulder injury that was aggravated, and related physiotherapy he underwent prior to the games upon: "All I wanted initially was to better the Sri Lanka record", he said. "But that did not come my way as I could not keep the pace in the second half. I swam the first 50m well but could not accelerate in the last 50m."

At 18, Reshika Udugampola was the youngest person to represent Sri Lanka at the London Olympic Games. She was making her first appearance in the Summer Games. Udugampola qualified for the Games through one of FINA's universality places because her fastest time of one minute and 4.23 seconds was 7.69 seconds slower than the "B" (FINA/Olympic Invitation Times) qualifying standard for the women's 100 metre freestyle. Like Unamboowe, Udugampola trained at Nunawading Aquatic Club in Melbourne before the Games. Prior to leaving for the Games, she spoke to the press about her excitement over taking part in London and called it "a once in a lifetime chance and we may never get it again. ... London is going to be something different. I've been training in Australia and I'm aiming for a national record, I don't know if I will get it but I'm going to focus on that." Udugampola participated in heat two on 1 August, finishing sixth out of seven athletes, with a time of one minute and 4.93 seconds. Overall she finished 44th out of 48 swimmers, (Note: Two swimmers, Cate Campbell and Therese Alshammar, did not start.) and was 10.5 seconds slower than the slowest athlete to advance to the semi-final.

Men

Athlete	Event	Heat		Semifinal		Final	
Athlete	Event	Time	Rank	Time	Rank	Time	Rank
Heshan Unamboowe	100 m backstroke	57.94	42	Did not advance			

Women

Athlete	Event	Heat		Semifinal		Final	
Athlete	Event	Time	Rank	Time	Rank	Time	Rank
Reshika Udugampola	100 m freestyle	1:04.93	44	Did not advance			

== See also ==
- Sri Lanka at the 2012 Summer Paralympics
