= Sri Lanka at the 2004 Summer Olympics =

- IOC code: SRI
- NOC: National Olympic Committee of Sri Lanka
- Website: www.srilankaolympic.org

in Athens
- Competitors: 8 in 3 sports
- Flag bearer: Susanthika Jayasinghe
- Medals: Gold 0 Silver 0 Bronze 0 Total 0

Summer Olympics appearances (overview)
- 1948; 1952; 1956; 1960; 1964; 1968; 1972; 1976; 1980; 1984; 1988; 1992; 1996; 2000; 2004; 2008; 2012; 2016; 2020; 2024; 2028

Sri Lanka competed at the 2004 Summer Olympics in Athens, Greece, from 13 to 29 August 2004.

== Athletics ==
Sri Lankan athletes have so far achieved qualifying standards in the following athletics events (up to a maximum of 3 athletes in each event at the 'A' Standard, and 1 at the 'B' Standard). Susanthika Jayasinghe was slated to be on the entry list for the women's 100 metres, but did not compete. She placed third in the same distance, and silver medalist, in the women's 200 metres in Sydney, but a fracture in her right leg caused her to pull out, though she did travel to Athens.

Men
Track & road events

Athlete	Event	Heat		Semifinal		Final	
Athlete	Event	Result	Rank	Result	Rank	Result	Rank
Anuradha Cooray	Marathon	—N/a				2:19:34	30
Rohan Pradeep Kumara	400 m	46.20	5	Did not advance			

Field events

Athlete	Event	Qualification		Final	
Athlete	Event	Distance	Position	Distance	Position
Manjula Kumara Wijesekara	High jump	2.20	=20	Did not advance	

Women
Track & road events

Athlete	Event	Heat		Quarterfinal		Semifinal		Final	
Athlete	Event	Result	Rank	Result	Rank	Result	Rank	Result	Rank
Damayanthi Dharsha	400 m	54.58	7	—N/a		Did not advance			
Susanthika Jayasinghe	100 m	DNS		Did not advance					

Key

- Note–Ranks given for track events are within the athlete's heat only
- Q = Qualified for the next round
- q = Qualified for the next round as a fastest loser or, in field events, by position without achieving the qualifying target
- NR = National record
- N/A = Round not applicable for the event
- Bye = Athlete not required to compete in round

== Shooting ==
Sri Lanka has qualified a single shooter.

Women

Athlete	Event	Qualification		Final	
Athlete	Event	Points	Rank	Points	Rank
Pushpamali Ramanayake	10 m air rifle	386	38	Did not advance	
Pushpamali Ramanayake	50 m rifle 3 positions	567	=25	Did not advance	

== Swimming ==
Men

Athlete	Event	Heat		Semifinal		Final	
Athlete	Event	Time	Rank	Time	Rank	Time	Rank
Conrad Francis	100 m butterfly	56.80	52	Did not advance			

Women

Athlete	Event	Heat		Semifinal		Final	
Athlete	Event	Time	Rank	Time	Rank	Time	Rank
Menaka de Silva	50 m freestyle	28.93	52	Did not advance			

== See also ==
- Sri Lanka at the 2002 Asian Games
- Sri Lanka at the 2004 Summer Paralympics
