= Reshika Udugampola =

Sri Lankan swimmer

Personal information
- Full name: Reshika Amali Udugampola
- Nationality: SRI
- Born: November 13, 1993 (age 32) Colombo, Sri Lanka
- Height: 1.60 m (5 ft 3 in)
- Weight: 54 kg (119 lb)

Sport
- Sport: Swimming
- Strokes: Freestyle

Reshika Amali Udugampola (born 13 November 1993) is a former Sri Lankan freestyle swimmer and sports administrator. She is also the current secretary of the National Olympic Committee of Sri Lanka's Athletes' Commission and also serves in the marketing sub-committee of the International Olympic Committee.

== Biography ==
Reshika was born in Colombo, Western Province. She initially attended the Southlands College, Galle as both of her parents were employed in Galle. She later switched to Gateway College, Colombo after her family moved from Galle to Colombo.

== Career ==
Reshika started swimming at the age of eight in 2003 in Galle. She pursued an interest in the sport of swimming similar to her sister. It was revealed that her sister was advised by the doctors to engage in swimming as a remedy to cure asthma. Since then, Reshika also joined swimming practices with her sister.

She won her maiden national title in 2010 in the women's 100m freestyle at the National Swimming Championships and was coached by Manoj Abeysinghe who was influential in Reshika reaching Olympic standards. She competed in the women's 50 metre butterfly at the 2010 FINA World Swimming Championships. She represented Sri Lanka at the 2011 World Aquatics Championships and she was the only female competitor at the competition from Sri Lanka. During the 2011 World Aquatics Championships, she competed in the women's 100 metre freestyle and in the 50m butterfly events.

She represented Sri Lanka at the 2012 Summer Olympics which was also her first and only appearance at the Olympics representing Sri Lanka. During the 2012 London Olympics, she competed in the women's 100 metre freestyle, finishing in 44th place overall in the heats, failing to qualify for the semifinals. Prior to the Olympics, she traveled to Australia and had a special one year training at the Nunawadig Aquatic Club in Melbourne.

After competing at the 2012 Olympics, she was appointed as the secretary of the NOCSL's Athletics Commission. She was nominated to the IOC's marketing committee from the South Asian region. In October 2020, she was appointed to the International Olympic Committee's marketing sub-committee. She is also currently a full time marketer attached to an international IT firm.
