= Christine Sonali Merrill =

Sri Lankan–American athlete (born 1987)

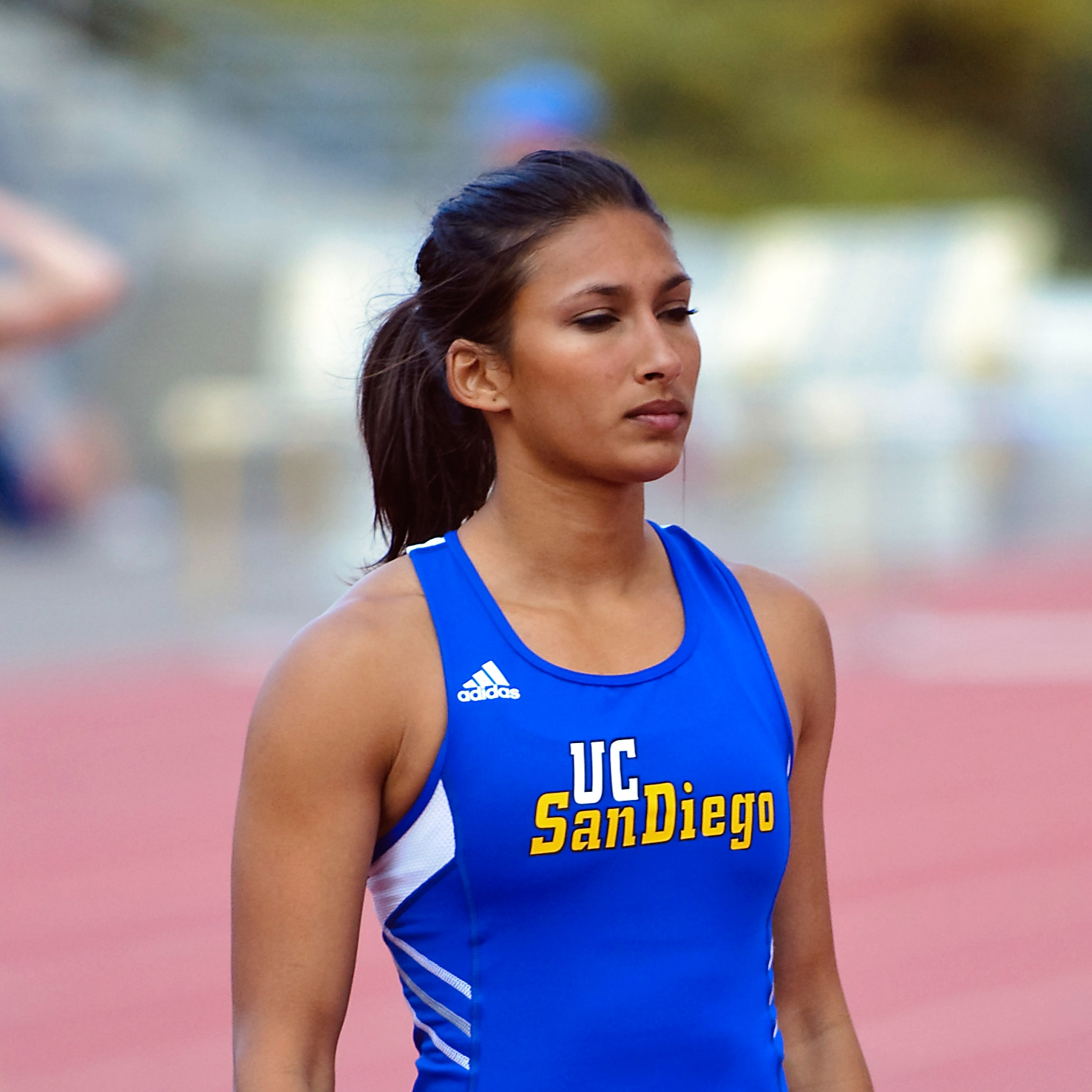

Personal information
- Nationality: Sri Lankan-American
- Born: August 20, 1987 (age 38) Bakersfield, California, United States of America
- Education: Bakersfield Christian High School
- Height: 1.67 m (5 ft 6 in)
- Weight: 57 kg (126 lb)

Sport
- Country: Sri Lanka
- Sport: Athletics
- Event: 400m Hurdles

Christine Sonali Merrill, also simply known as Christine Merill (born August 20, 1987), is a former Sri Lankan–American track and field athlete and mechanical engineer. During her career, she specialized in the 400m hurdles event and also occasionally competed in 100m, 200m, 100m hurdles, 4 × 100m relay and 4 × 400m relay events.

== Career ==
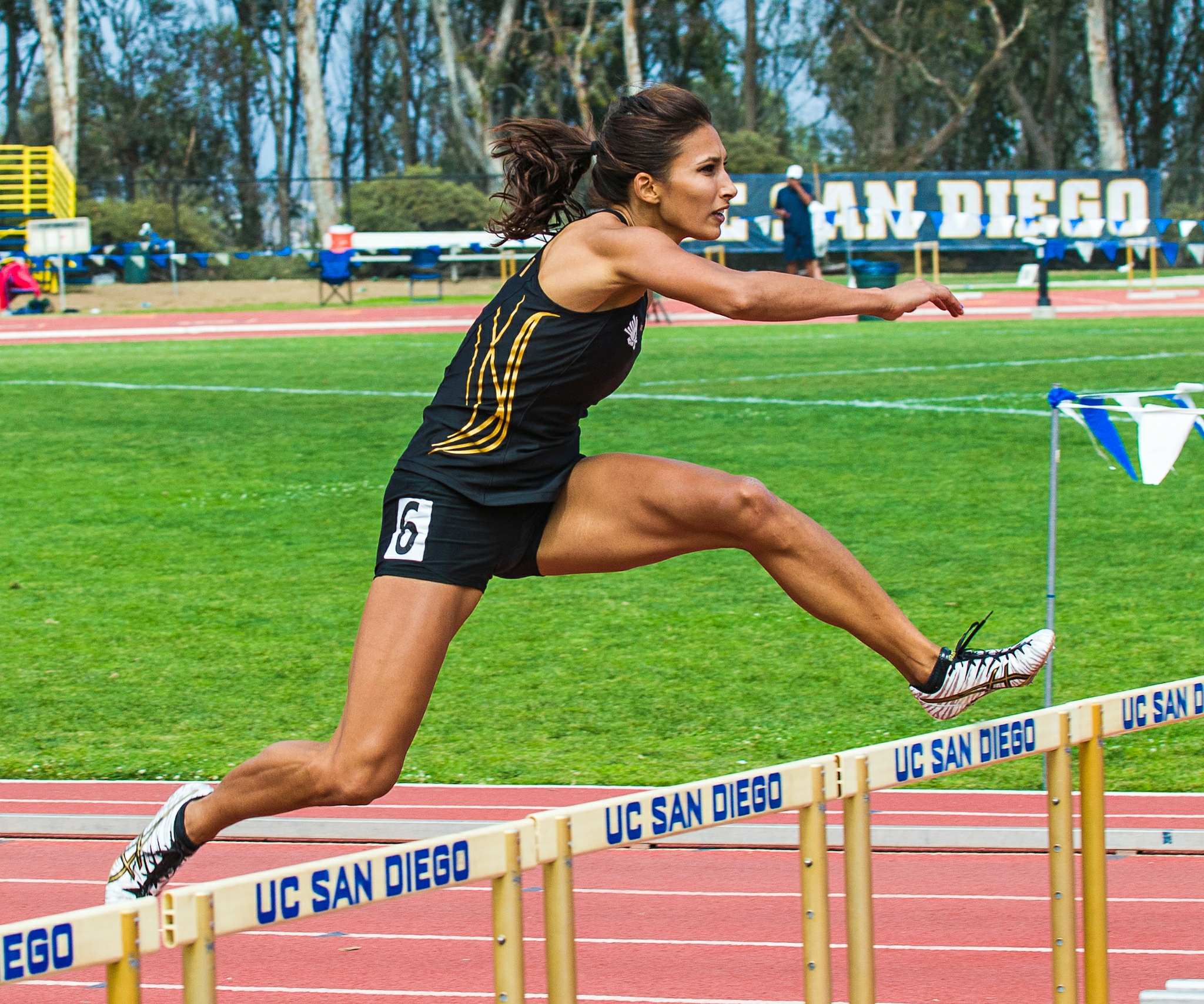
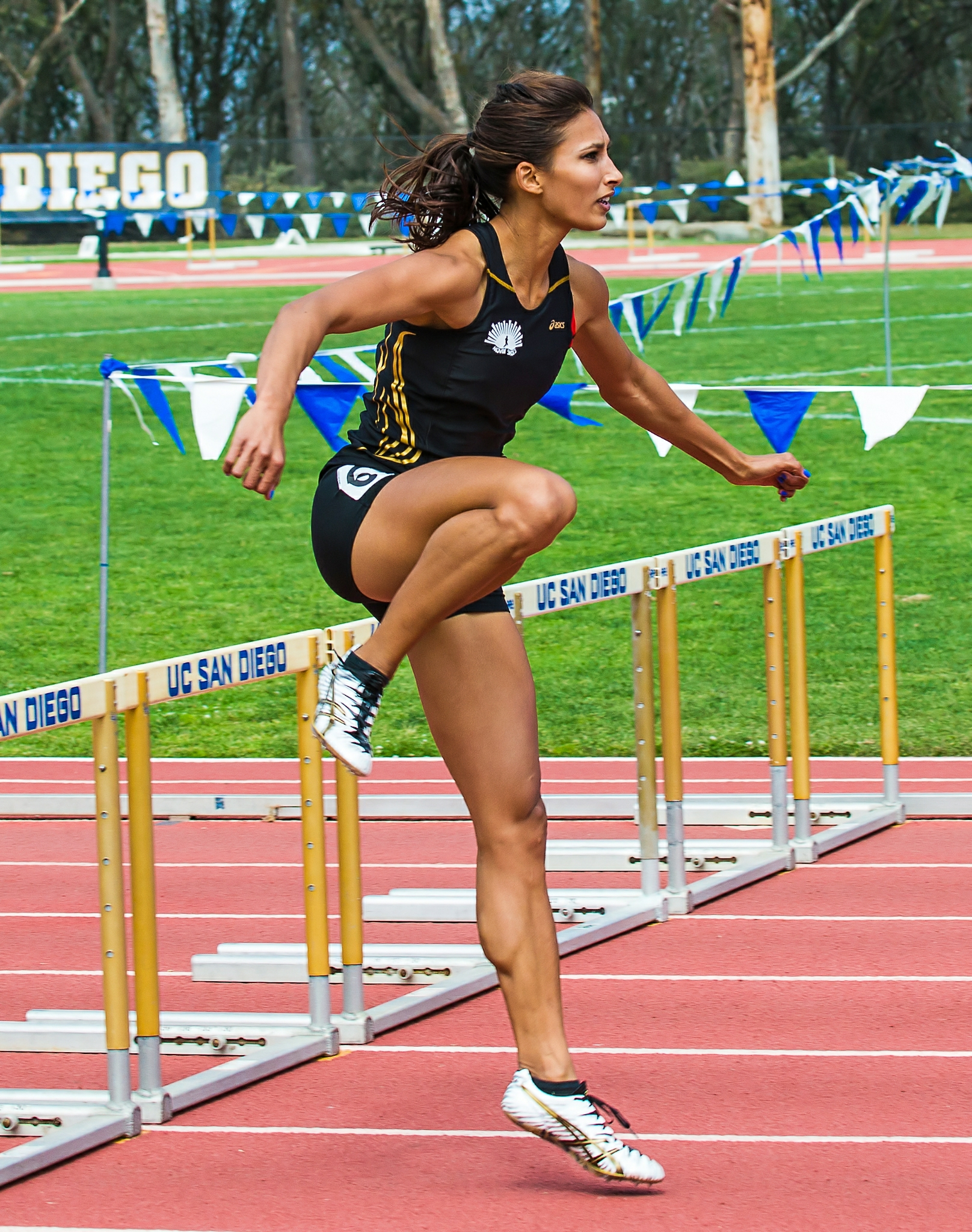
Christine Sonali Merill in action at the 2013 UC San Diego Triton Invitational

Born in Bakersfield, California, Merrill joined University of California, San Diego for her higher education after graduating from the Bakersfield Christian High School. She decided to focus solely on pursuing degree in mechanical engineering at the Jacobs School of Engineering attached to the University of California after realising that the university do not offer athletic scholarships. Her opportunity to pursue her career in athletics was also hampered after sustaining a knee injury after playing a domestic basketball match. However, she joined the Tritons track and field team during her second year at the University of California. She took part in university competitions such as Central Section track and field Masters meet. She won eight All-American honours for the university, and won the NCAA Division II women's 400m hurdles title in 2009.

She graduated from the University of California, San Diego in 2010 with a Major degree in mechanical engineering. After completing her higher studies, she pursued her career as an engineer in San Diego for a solar turbine company. She also continued her passion towards her athletic career while also being employed as an engineer at the solar turbine company in customer design division. She also served as a member of Movin Shoes Elite Athletic Development Program, an initiative which provides support to past collegiate track and field athletes in San Diego area.

She gained her first international experience representing Sri Lanka in 2011 when she won the bronze medal in the women's 400m hurdles just behind Satomi Kubokura of Japan and Yang Qi of China at the 2011 Asian Athletics Championships in Kobe after completing it in 57.30 seconds. She also competed in the women's 400m hurdles at the 2011 Athletics World Championships in Daegu and was eliminated in the heats after finishing the event at 27th place with a timing 57.05 seconds. In July 2011, she was the only Sri Lankan athlete to hold an IAAF ranking.

She spent her own money which she earned from working as an engineer in order to compete at the pre-Olympic meets in Jamaica and in Belgium prior to 2012 Olympics. She narrowly missed out on a bronze medal at the Jamaican Championships which was held in Kingston where she recorded a timing of 57.89 seconds. In May 2012, she claimed a bronze medal at the Bangkok Asian Grand Prix with a timing of 58.20 seconds and also secured fourth place at the Kanchanaburi Asian Grand Prix.

She made her maiden Olympics appearance representing Sri Lanka at the 2012 Summer Olympics. In July 2012, she received a wild card entry to compete at the 2012 Summer Olympics after failing to meet direct qualification criteria. She was also the only female track and field athlete from Sri Lanka to compete at the 2012 Olympics and was just one of two track and field athletes from Sri Lanka to represent the county at the London Olympics alongside Anuradha Cooray. She took part in the women's 400m hurdles at the 2012 London Olympics and was placed at 30th position and was eliminated in the first round, though she broke her own seasonal record with 57.15 seconds. She was persuaded by the then President of Athletic Association of Sri Lanka Major General Palitha Fernando to represent Sri Lanka at the 2012 Olympics and she qualified to represent Sri Lanka at the Olympics through her mother. She also received media attention from viewers and became an internet sensation when she was lined up as part of Sri Lankan contingent during the opening ceremony of the 2012 London Olympics. She was also included in a list of most attractive Olympic athletes of all time. She was also dubbed as an "Accidental Olympian" by the San Diego Union-Tribune. Christine also became the first UC San Diego's first track and field athlete to compete at the Olympics and became the third Olympian from Bakersfield to participate at the Olympics after Jimmy Watkins and Jake Varner.

Her personal best of 56.45 which she set in Chula Vista also ranks as the national record of Sri Lanka. She finished fourth in the women's hurdles event at the 2013 Asian Athletics Championships in Pune with a timing of 59.72 seconds and followed it up with fifth place finish as part of the Sri Lankan team in the women's 4 x 400 meter relay with a timing of 3: 39.54 minutes. She also competed in the 400m hurdles at the 2013 World Championships in Moscow, but was disqualified in the preliminary round. She also represented Sri Lanka at the 2014 Commonwealth Games in Glasgow which also marked her maiden appearance at the Commonwealth Games. During the 2014 Commonwealth Games, she was eliminated with a timing of 58.65 seconds in the first round. In 2014, she competed in her last competition in San Marcos and then ended her career as a track and field athlete at the age of 27.

== Biography ==
She was born to Sri Lankan mother Neloufa Merill and American father Alex Merill in Bakersfield, California, in the USA. Her parents were pediatricians and met each other for the first time during residency. She has one elder sister and three young siblings. Her grand father Terrence Isaac Pereram was an engineer.
