= Sri Lanka at the 2016 Summer Olympics =

- IOC code: SRI
- NOC: National Olympic Committee of Sri Lanka
- Website: www.srilankaolympic.org

in Rio de Janeiro
- Competitors: 9 in 6 sports
- Flag bearer: Anuradha Cooray
- Medals: Gold 0 Silver 0 Bronze 0 Total 0

Summer Olympics appearances (overview)
- 1948; 1952; 1956; 1960; 1964; 1968; 1972; 1976; 1980; 1984; 1988; 1992; 1996; 2000; 2004; 2008; 2012; 2016; 2020; 2024

Sri Lanka competed at the 2016 Summer Olympics in Rio de Janeiro, Brazil, from 5 to 21 August 2016. This was the nation's seventeenth appearance at the Summer Olympics, with the exception of the 1976 Summer Olympics in Montreal. Six of the nation's Olympic editions were previously designated as Ceylon.

The National Olympic Committee of Sri Lanka sent a team of nine athletes, seven men and two women, to compete in six different sports at the Games, matching the nation's roster size with Atlanta two decades earlier. Three Sri Lankan athletes previously competed in London, including rifle shooter Mangala Samarakoon and badminton player Niluka Karunaratne. Meanwhile, veteran marathon runner Anuradha Cooray, who attended his third Olympics as the oldest and most experienced participant (aged 38), was selected by the committee to carry the Sri Lankan flag at the opening ceremony.

Sri Lanka, however, did not earn any Olympic medals in Rio de Janeiro; the nation's last medal was awarded to sprinter Susanthika Jayasinghe, who won silver in the women's 200 metres at the 2000 Summer Olympics in Sydney.

== Athletics (track and field) ==
Sri Lanka qualified three athletes, two male and one female.

Key

- Note–Ranks given for track events are within the athlete's heat only
- Q = Qualified for the next round
- q = Qualified for the next round as a fastest loser or, in field events, by position without achieving the qualifying target
- NR = National record
- N/A = Round not applicable for the event
- NM = No mark

Track & road events

Athlete	Event	Final	
Athlete	Event	Result	Rank
Anuradha Cooray	Men's marathon	2:17:06	34
Niluka Geethani Rajasekara	Women's marathon	3:11:05	129

Field events

Athlete	Event	Qualification		Final	
Athlete	Event	Distance	Position	Distance	Position
Sumeda Ranasinghe	Men's javelin throw	71.93	36	Did not advance	

== Badminton ==
Sri Lanka received an invitation from the Tripartite Commission to send London 2012 Olympian Niluka Karunaratne in the men's singles event.

Athlete	Event	Group stage				Elimination	Quarterfinal	Semifinal	Final / BM	
Athlete	Event	Opposition Score	Opposition Score	Opposition Score	Rank	Opposition Score	Opposition Score	Opposition Score	Opposition Score	Rank
Niluka Karunaratne	Men's singles	Chen L (CHN); L (7–21, 10–21)	Cordón (GUA); W WO	Dziółko (POL); W (21–19, 24–22)	2	Did not advance				

== Judo ==
Sri Lanka received an invitation from the Tripartite Commission to send a judoka competing in the men's lightweight category (73 kg), signifying the nation's Olympic debut in the sport.

Athlete	Event	Round of 64	Round of 32	Round of 16	Quarterfinals	Semifinals	Repechage	Final / BM	
Athlete	Event	Opposition Result	Opposition Result	Opposition Result	Opposition Result	Opposition Result	Opposition Result	Opposition Result	Rank
Chamara Repiyallage	Men's −73 kg	Bye	Waterhouse (ASA); W 100–000	Shavdatuashvili (GEO); L 000–100	Did not advance				

== Shooting ==
Sri Lanka received an invitation from the Tripartite Commission to send a men's rifle shooter to the Olympics, as long as the minimum qualifying score (MQS) was met by March 31, 2016.

Athlete	Event	Qualification		Final	
Athlete	Event	Points	Rank	Points	Rank
Mangala Samarakoon	Men's 10 m air rifle	589.6	50	Did not advance	
Mangala Samarakoon	Men's 50 m rifle prone	601.8	47	Did not advance	

Qualification Legend: Q = Qualify for the next round; q = Qualify for the bronze medal (shotgun)

== Swimming ==
Sri Lanka received a Universality invitation from FINA to send one female swimmer, to the Olympics. Matthew Abeysinghe is also scheduled to represent the country, after meeting the B standard time at a qualification meet in July 2016. Abeysinghe was the first swimmer ever from Sri Lanka to meet the qualification standard for the Olympics.

Athlete	Event	Heat		Semifinal		Final	
Athlete	Event	Time	Rank	Time	Rank	Time	Rank
Matthew Abeysinghe	Men's 100 m freestyle	50.96	50	Did not advance			
Kimiko Raheem	Women's 100 m backstroke	1:04.21	28	Did not advance			

== Weightlifting ==
Sri Lanka received an unused quota place from IWF to send a male weightlifter, signifying the nation's return to the sport after an eight-year hiatus.

Athlete	Event	Snatch		Clean & jerk		Total	Rank
Athlete	Event	Result	Rank	Result	Rank	Total	Rank
Sudesh Peiris	Men's −62 kg	~~120~~	DNF	—	—	—	DNF

== See also ==
- Sri Lanka at the 2016 South Asian Games
- Sri Lanka at the 2016 Summer Paralympics
