= Sri Lanka at the 2000 Summer Olympics =

- IOC code: SRI
- NOC: National Olympic Committee of Sri Lanka
- Website: www.srilankaolympic.org

in Sydney
- Competitors: 18 (13 men, 5 women) in 4 sports
- Flag bearer: Damayanthi Darsha
- Medals Ranked 64th: Gold 0 Silver 1 Bronze 0 Total 1

Summer Olympics appearances (overview)
- 1948; 1952; 1956; 1960; 1964; 1968; 1972; 1976; 1980; 1984; 1988; 1992; 1996; 2000; 2004; 2008; 2012; 2016; 2020; 2024

Sri Lanka competed at the 2000 Summer Olympics in Sydney, Australia. The nation won its first Olympic medal since 1948. Sri Lanka has sent their ever largest number of competitors (18) for an Olympic game in this event.

== Medalists ==
Medal	Name	Sport	Event
Silver	Susanthika Jayasinghe	Athletics	Women's 200 m

== Athletics ==
Men
Track and road events

Athlete	Event	Heat		Quarterfinal		Semifinal		Final	
Athlete	Event	Time	Rank	Time	Rank	Time	Rank	Time	Rank
Rohan Pradeep Kumara	400 m	46.00	35	Did not advance					
Sugath Thilakaratne	400 m	45.48	9 Q	45.54	17	Did not advance			
Sarath Prasanna Gamage	Marathon	—N/a						2:34:39	73
Harijan Ratnayake	400 m hurdles	50.43	31	—N/a		Did not advance			
Rohan Pradeep Kumara; Ratna Kumar; Ranga Wimalawansa; Sugath Thilakaratne; Manura Kuranage Perera (heats)	4 × 400 m relay	3:06.25	15 Q	—N/a		3:02.89	12	Did not advance	

Women
Track and road events

Athlete	Event	Heat		Quarterfinal		Semifinal		Final	
Athlete	Event	Time	Rank	Time	Rank	Time	Rank	Time	Rank
Susanthika Jayasinghe	100 m	11.15	5 Q	11.23	12 Q	11.33	11	Did not advance	
Susanthika Jayasinghe	200 m	22.53	2 Q	22.54	4 Q	22.45	3 Q	22.28	2nd place, silver medalist(s)
Damayanthi Dharsha	400 m	52.13	19 Q	52.35	23	Did not advance			
Sriyani Kulawansa	100 m hurdles	13.10	17 Q	13.19	18	Did not advance			
Tamara Samandeepika; Pradeepa Herath; Nimmi de Zoysa; Damayanthi Dharsha	4 × 100 m relay	44.51	19	—N/a		Did not advance			

== Sailing ==
Athlete	Event	Race											Points	Rank
Athlete	Event	1	2	3	4	5	6	7	8	9	10	11	Points	Rank
Lalin Jirasinha	Finn	23	25	25	~~26~~	~~26~~	26	26	26	26	25	22	224	25

== Shooting ==
Athlete	Event	Qualification		Final		Total	
Athlete	Event	Points	Rank	Points	Rank	Points	Rank
Ruwani Abeymanne	Women's 25 m pistol	553	42	Did not advance			
Ruwani Abeymanne	Women's 10 m air pistol	374	31	Did not advance			
Malini Wickramasinghe	Women's 50 m rifle three positions	528	42	Did not advance			
Malini Wickramasinghe	Women's 10 m air rifle	382	47	Did not advance			

== Swimming ==
Athlete	Event	Heat		Semifinal		Final	
Athlete	Event	Time	Rank	Time	Rank	Time	Rank
Conrad Francis	Men's 100 m butterfly	57.44	58	Did not advance			
Theekshana Ratnasekera	Women's 50 m freestyle	29.88	64	Did not advance			
