= Niluka Karunaratne =

Sri Lankan badminton player

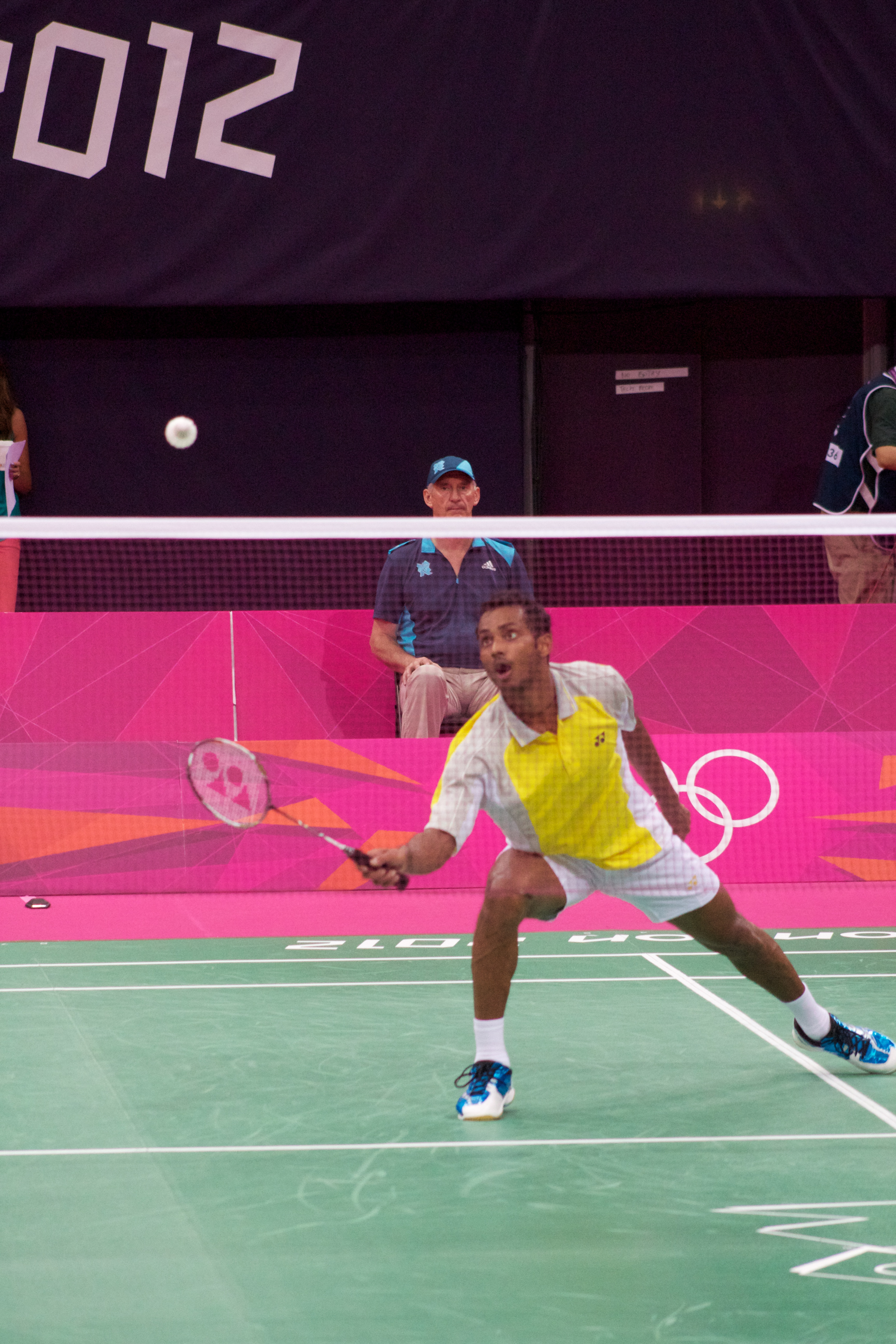
- Karunaratne at the 2012 Summer Olympics

Personal information
- Born: 13 February 1985 (age 41) Galle, Sri Lanka
- Height: 1.72 m (5 ft 8 in)
- Weight: 65 kg (143 lb)

Sport
- Country: Sri Lanka
- Sport: Badminton
- Handedness: Right
- Coached by: Louie Karunaratne

Men's singles
- Highest ranking: 34 (27 June 2013)
- BWF profile
Medal record
Men's badminton
Representing Sri Lanka
World Senior Championships
Silver medal – second place	2025 Pattaya	Men's singles 35+
South Asian Games
Silver medal – second place	2006 Colombo	Men's team
Silver medal – second place	2010 Dhaka	Men's team
Bronze medal – third place	2004 Islamabad	Men's team
Bronze medal – third place	2010 Dhaka	Mixed doubles

Niluka Karunaratne (Sinhala: නිලූක කරුණාරත්න; Tamil: நிலுக கருணாரத்ன) (born 13 February 1985) is a Sri Lankan badminton player who has competed at the Olympics in 2012, 2016 and 2020. His father Louie Karunaratne and brothers Dinuka Karunaratne, Chamika Karunaratne (also a cricketer) and Diluka Karunaratne are also professional badminton players. He is currently regarded as the number one premiere badminton player in Sri Lanka and Sri Lanka's most decorated badminton player with a record 21 medals to his name at international events including 9 gold medals. He also holds the unique distinction of winning five gold medals in five different continents. He reached his higher career singles ranking of 34 in June 2013, which is also the personal best ranking by a Sri Lankan badminton player. He has also emerged as national badminton champion for record 17 times, the most by a Sri Lankan badminton player. Despite his achievements in the sport, he was also sidelined for disciplinary issues on few occasions.

== Career ==
Karunaratne, born in the coastal area of Galle, received his primary and secondary education in Dharmasoka College, Ambalangoda and Royal College, Colombo, where he won the Royal Crown in 2001. He took up badminton at the age of 8, having been introduced to the sport by his father, who was a national level badminton player. He became the youngest ever Sri Lankan national badminton champion at the age of 16 in 2001 after winning his maiden national title on debut appearance at the Sri Lankan Badminton Nationals.

Karunaratne competed in five consecutives Commonwealth Games from 2002 to 2018. At the 2014 Commonwealth Games, he was knocked out of the men's singles in the round of 16 by Srikanth Kidambi. He was also part of the Sri Lankan mixed badminton team, which was knocked out at the quarterfinal stage by England.

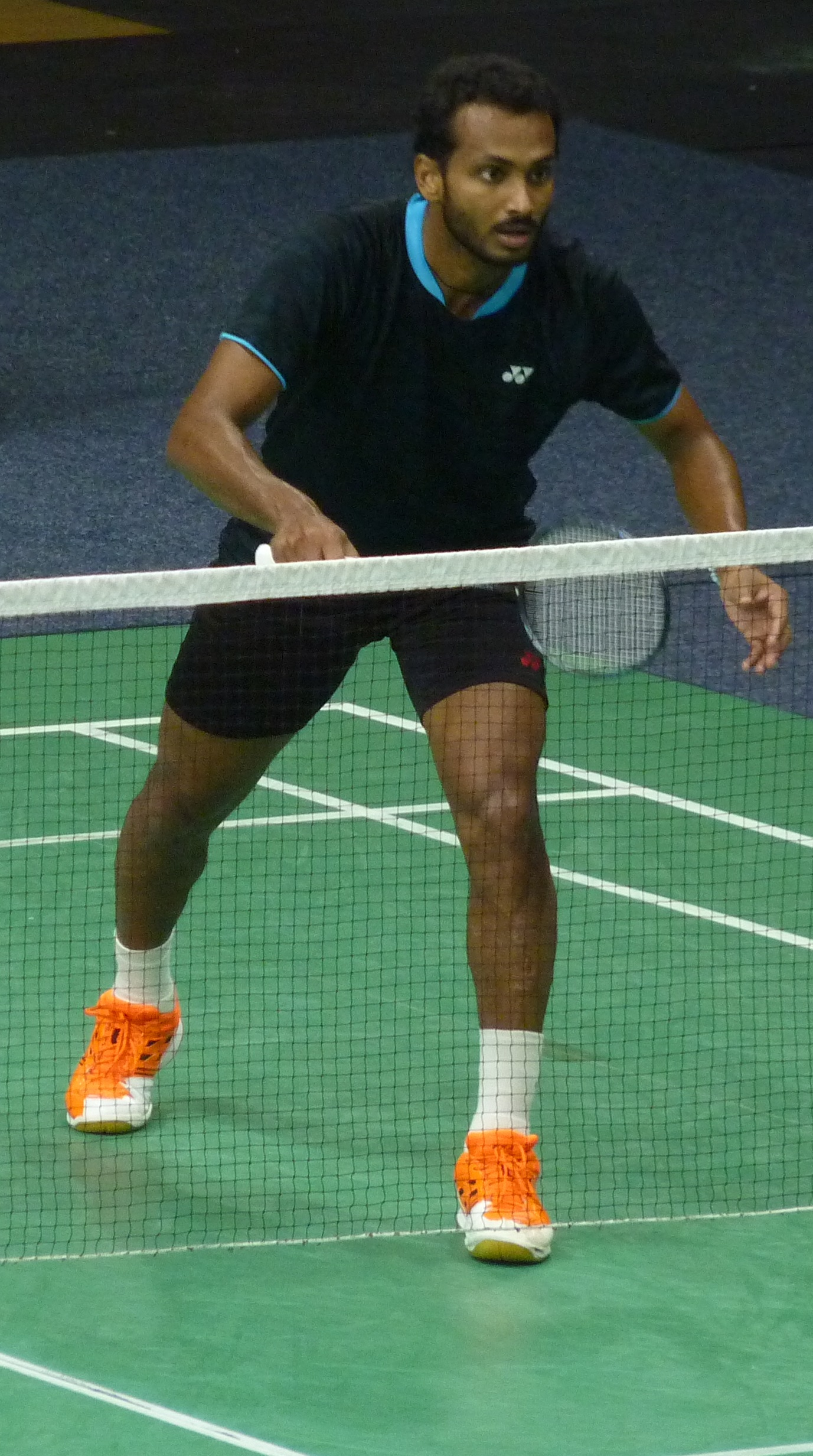
Karunaratne at the 2018 Dutch Open

He won his first international badminton championship in 2011 after emerging victorious in the men's singles event at the Puerto Rico International. He also set a record for winning most consecutive number of men's singles title at the Sri Lankan Badminton Nationals during 9 occasions from 2000 to 2009.

As of July 2012, he was ranked 48th in the men's singles from the BWF World Ranking. In 2012, the Sri Lankan Daily News called him "Sri Lanka’s undisputed badminton champion".

He was selected to captain the Sri Lankan contingent to the 2012 Summer Olympics in his debut Olympic appearance and was also the flagbearer for Sri Lanka during the closing ceremony of the 2012 Summer Olympics. On 30 July 2012, Karunaratne defeated world eighth-ranked Kenichi Tago of Japan 2–0. Karunaratne defeated Tago 21–18, 21–16 in 44 minutes at the Wembley Arena in the Olympic men's badminton singles Group C at the 2012 Summer Olympics. The Associated Press quoted him as saying: "This is the biggest win in the history of Sri Lanka badminton". India's Parupalli Kashyap defeated him in a closely fought pre-quarter match.

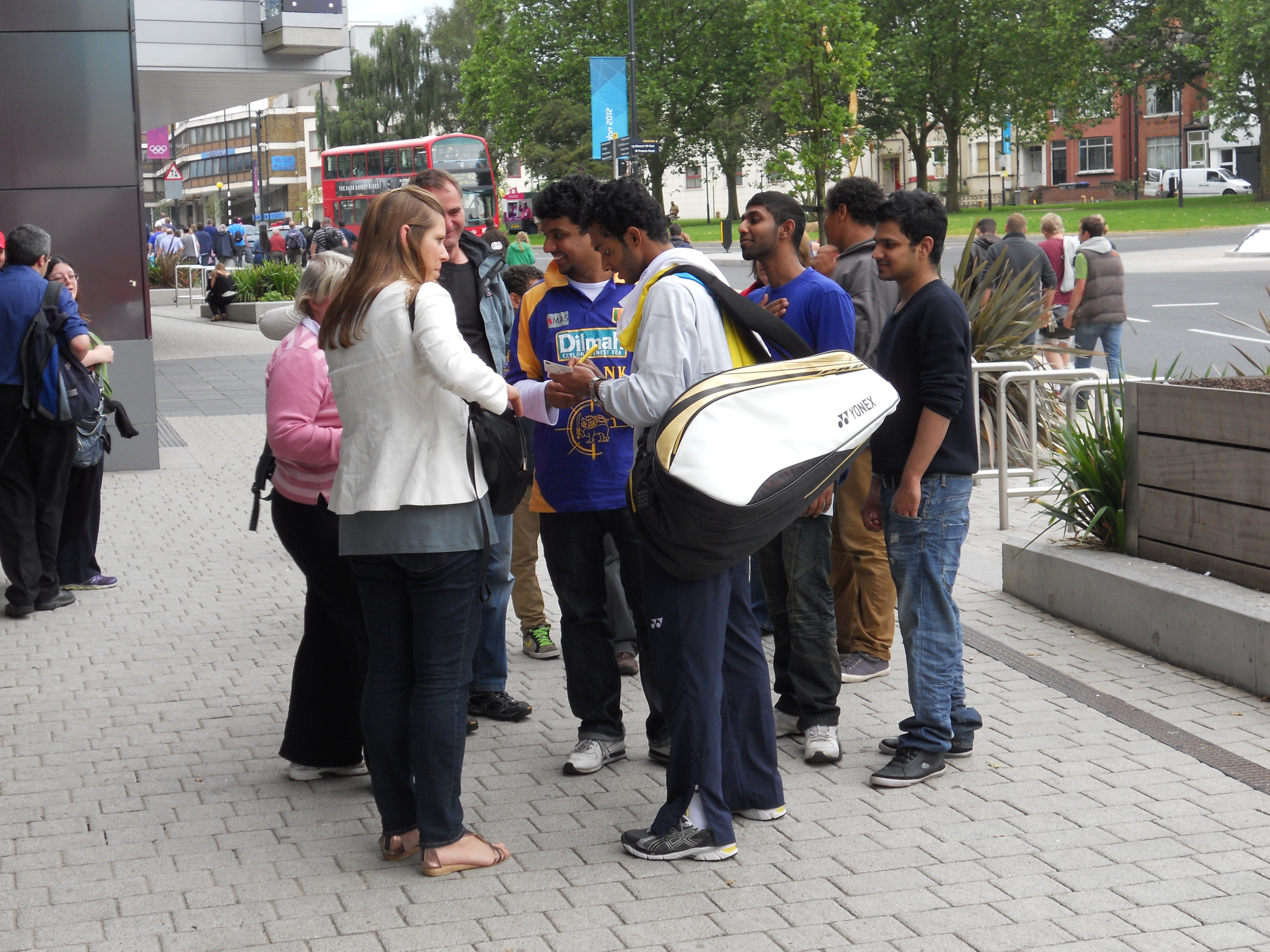
Karunaratne signing autographs for fans

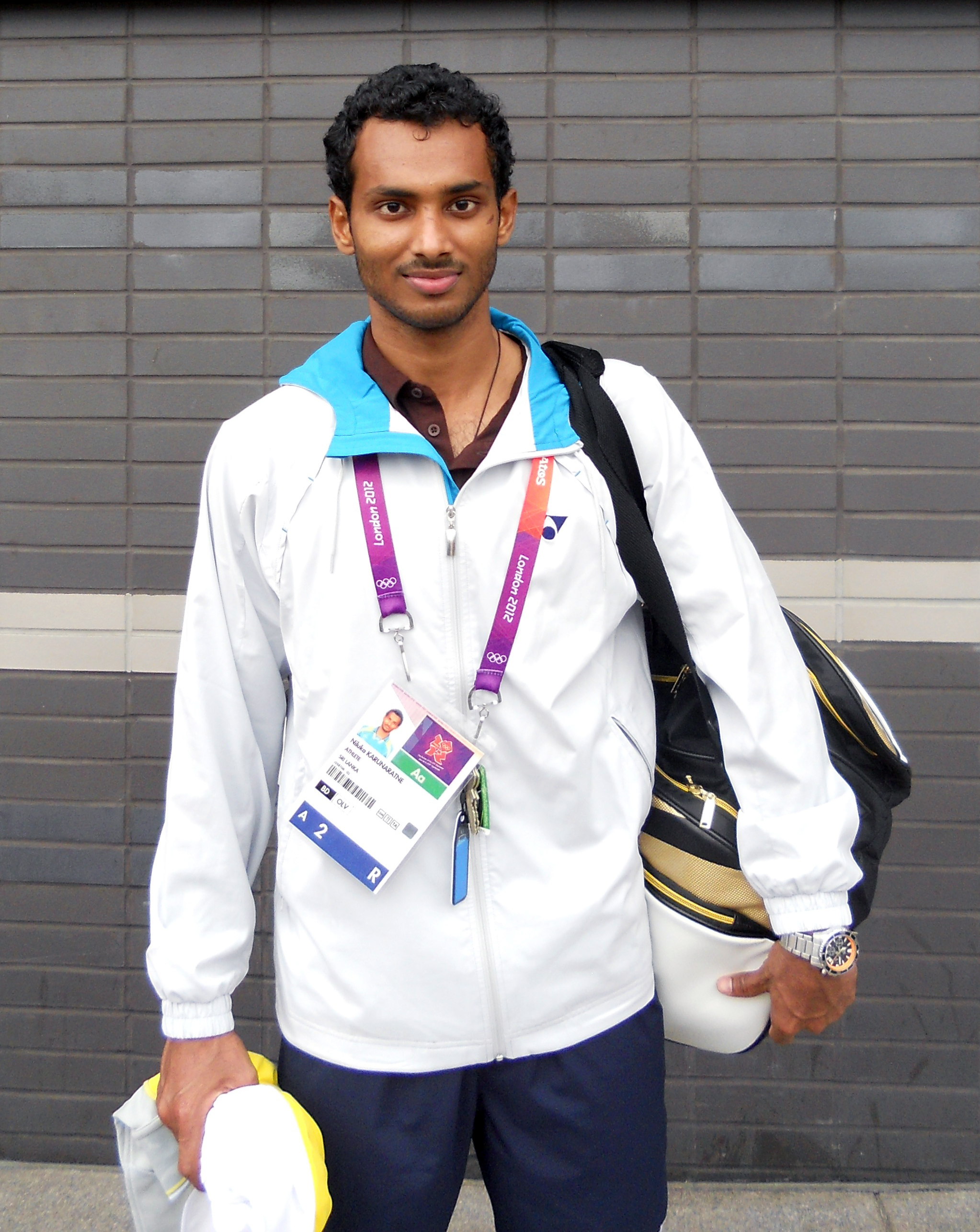
Karunaratne at the London 2012 Olympics

He made his second Summer Olympics appearance at the 2016 Summer Olympics representing Sri Lanka amid various difficulties as he was not eligible to compete in local and international badminton events due to the temporary ban on Sri Lankan Badminton Federation imposed by the Badminton World Federation in 2015.

In January 2021, he tested positive for COVID-19 along with his younger brother Chamika and Niluka was disbanded from the National Badminton Association. However, he pledged to participate in badminton competitions after recovering from COVID-19 and in February 2021, he along with his younger brother and national cricketer Chamika Karunaratne played in the first round encounters in the men's singles of the Sri Lankan Badminton Nationals 2020. He announced his retirement from competing in local events after claiming the national badminton title for the record seventeenth time in 2021. However, he continued to compete in foreign competition with the aim of qualifying for the 2020 Summer Olympics in Tokyo. In May 2021, Niluka reached the semifinals of the 56th edition of the Portuguese International Badminton Championships but was eliminated from the semis after losing to Germany's Max Weisskirchen.

He also qualified to represent Sri Lanka at the 2020 Summer Olympics after receiving tripartite commission quota from Badminton World Federation and it would also mark his third appearance at the Olympics and also went onto become the sixth Sri Lankan competitor to qualify for the Tokyo Olympics. He will also become the first Sri Lankan badminton player to compete at three successive Olympics. He announced that he would officially retire from international badminton after competing at the delayed 2020 Tokyo Olympics in July 2021. He was accompanied by his brother Dinuka Karunaratne as his partner in lead up to the 2020 Olympics.

He also holds a position in the banking sector as a bank employee.

== Controversies ==
During the opening ceremony of the 2012 Summer Olympics, Niluka was controversially appointed as the captain of the seven member Sri Lankan contingent by the National Olympic Committee of Sri Lanka during the multi-sport event despite having experienced Anuradha Cooray in the mix who already competed previously at an Olympic event in 2004. Anuradha claimed that he should have been appointed as the captain of Sri Lankan Olympic team instead of Niluka whom he termed as novice and Anuradha insisted that Niluka hasn't done anything exceptional prior to competing at the Olympics. However, Niluka disagreed regarding the comments made by Anuradha Cooray.

In 2014, Sri Lanka Badminton Association took disciplinary action against Niluka for acting in an undisciplined manner during the selection trials prior to the 2014 Commonwealth Games.

In 2018, after losing the quarterfinal match against in the Badminton Nationals Buwanika Gunathilaka he had a brawl with a spectator who was seen cheering for Buwanika Gunathilaka during the match.

== Achievements ==
=== World Senior Championships ===
Men's singles
Year	Age	Venue	Opponent	Score	Result	Ref.
2025	35+	Eastern National Sports Training Centre; Pattaya, Thailand	(Thailand) Suppanyu Avihingsanon	6–21, 21–9, 18–21	Silver	

=== South Asian Games ===
Mixed doubles
Year	Venue	Partner	Opponent	Score	Result
2010	Wooden-Floor Gymnasium; Dhaka, Bangladesh	(Sri Lanka) Renu Hettiarachchige	(India) Sanave Thomas (India) Aparna Balan	14–21, 13–21	Bronze

=== BWF International Challenge/Series (10 titles, 5 runners-up) ===
Men's singles
Year	Tournament	Opponent	Score	Result
2011	Puerto Rico International	(Austria) Michael Lahnsteiner	21–18, 21–15	(gold) Winner
2011	Miami International	(Peru) Rodrigo Pacheco	21–12, 21–14	(gold) Winner
2011	Welsh International	(Malaysia) Lok Chong Chieh	21–16, 18–21, 21–19	(gold) Winner
2012	Uganda International	(Italy) Wisnu Haryo Putro	21–11, 21–18	(gold) Winner
2012	Iran Fajr International	(India) Sameer Verma	21–18, 21–15	(gold) Winner
2012	Brazil International	(Guatemala) Kevin Cordón	21–17, 20–22, 19–21	(silver) Runner-up
2012	Bahrain International	(India) B. Sai Praneeth	21–14, 14–21, 17–21	(silver) Runner-up
2014	Dutch International	(Denmark) Rasmus Fladberg	Walkover	(silver) Runner-up
2016	Uganda International	(Portugal) Pedro Martins	21–17, 21–15	(gold) Winner
2016	Portugal International	(Sweden) Gabriel Ulldahl	21–17, 21–13	(gold) Winner
2017	Brazil International	(Brazil) Ygor Coelho	9–21, 21–14, 21–18	(gold) Winner
2019	Benin International	(Azerbaijan) Ade Resky Dwicahyo	23–21, 21–17	(gold) Winner
2020	Uganda International	(Hungary) Gergely Krausz	18–21, 21–18, 13–21	(silver) Runner-up

Men's doubles
Year	Tournament	Partner	Opponent	Score	Result
2010	Maldives International	(Sri Lanka) Dinuka Karunaratna	(Pakistan) Sulehri Kashif Ali (Pakistan) Rizwan Azam	21–18, 18–21, 15–21	(silver) Runner-up
2016	Uganda International	(Sri Lanka) Dinuka Karunaratna	(Egypt) Ali Ahmed El Khateeb (Egypt) Abdelrahman Kashkal	21–17, 21–17	(gold) Winner

BWF International Challenge tournament
BWF International Series tournament

== See also ==
- Niroshan Wijekoon
- List of Sri Lankans by sport

Olympic Games
Preceded by Susanthika Jayasinghe	Flagbearer for Sri Lanka; London 2012	Succeeded by Anuradha Cooray
