= Ceylon at the 1952 Summer Olympics =

- IOC code: CEY

in Helsinki
- Competitors: 5 in 4 sports
- Medals: Gold 0 Silver 0 Bronze 0 Total 0

Summer Olympics appearances (overview)
- 1948; 1952; 1956; 1960; 1964; 1968; 1972; 1976; 1980; 1984; 1988; 1992; 1996; 2000; 2004; 2008; 2012; 2016; 2020; 2024

Ceylon, competed at the 1952 Summer Olympics in Helsinki, Finland.

== Athletics ==
High jump

- Nagalingam Ethirveerasingam
  - Preliminary Round

== Boxing ==
- Leslie Handunge
- Basil Henricus

== Diving ==
Men

Athlete	Event	Preliminary		Final	
Athlete	Event	Points	Rank	Points	Rank
Allan Smith	3 m springboard	55.00	31	Did not advance	

== Swimming ==
Men

Ranks given are within the heat.

Athlete	Event	Heat		Semifinal		Final	
Athlete	Event	Time	Rank	Time	Rank	Time	Rank
Geoffrey Marks	100 m freestyle	1:04.1	7	Did not advance			
Geoffrey Marks	400 m freestyle	5:15.2	6	Did not advance			
Geoffrey Marks	1500 m freestyle	20:59.4	5	—		Did not advance	
