= Sri Lanka at the 2008 Summer Olympics =

- IOC code: SRI
- NOC: National Olympic Committee of Sri Lanka
- Website: www.srilankaolympic.org

in Beijing
- Competitors: 8 in 6 sports
- Flag bearers: Susanthika Jayasinghe (opening and closing)
- Medals: Gold 0 Silver 0 Bronze 0 Total 0

Summer Olympics appearances (overview)
- 1948; 1952; 1956; 1960; 1964; 1968; 1972; 1976; 1980; 1984; 1988; 1992; 1996; 2000; 2004; 2008; 2012; 2016; 2020; 2024; 2028

Sri Lanka competed in the 2008 Summer Olympics held in Beijing, People's Republic of China from August 8 to August 24, 2008.The Sri Lankan olympic committee confirmed 4 men and three women have been selected to compete in 5 sports. Later Chinthana Vidanage received a tripartite commission invitation to participate in weightlifting. This now brings the total count to 8 athletes competing in 6 sports.

== Athletics ==
Susanthika Jayasinghe has been selected to represent Sri Lanka at the 2008 summer olympics in Athletics. She was selected to compete in both 100 m and 200 m. But soon after landed, she decided not to compete in the 100 metres. Nadeeka Lakmali has qualified to represent Sri Lanka in the javelin throw.

Women
Track & road events

Athlete	Event	Heat		Quarterfinal		Semifinal		Final	
Athlete	Event	Result	Rank	Result	Rank	Result	Rank	Result	Rank
Susanthika Jayasinghe	200 m	23.04	2 Q	22.94	3 Q	22.98	7	Did not advance	

Field events

Athlete	Event	Qualification		Final	
Athlete	Event	Distance	Position	Distance	Position
Nadeeka Lakmali	Javelin throw	54.28	43	Did not advance	

Key

- Note–Ranks given for track events are within the athlete's heat only
- Q = Qualified for the next round
- q = Qualified for the next round as a fastest loser or, in field events, by position without achieving the qualifying target
- NR = National record
- N/A = Round not applicable for the event
- Bye = Athlete not required to compete in round

== Badminton ==
Athlete	Event	Round of 64	Round of 32	Round of 16	Quarterfinal	Semifinal	Final / BM	
Athlete	Event	Opposition Score	Opposition Score	Opposition Score	Opposition Score	Opposition Score	Opposition Score	Rank
Thilini Jayasinghe	Women's singles	Nguyen (VIE); L 13–21, 16–21	Did not advance					

== Boxing ==
Sri Lanka qualified one boxer for the Olympic boxing tournament. Anurudha Rathnayake earned a spot in the Olympic flyweight competition with his performance at the 2007 World Championships.

Athlete	Event	Round of 32	Round of 16	Quarterfinals	Semifinals	Final	
Athlete	Event	Opposition Result	Opposition Result	Opposition Result	Opposition Result	Opposition Result	Rank
Anurudha Rathnayake	Flyweight	Vieira (BRA); L 3–13	Did not advance				

== Shooting ==
Sri Lanka qualified one shooter for the Olympic Shooting tournament. Edirisinghe Senanayake qualified in the 50 m Pistol Men event by virtue of finishing in the first qualifying position (not first overall) at the 2007 Asian shooting championships in Kuwait.

Men

Athlete	Event	Qualification		Final	
Athlete	Event	Points	Rank	Points	Rank
Edirisinghe Senanayake	10 m air pistol	561	48	Did not advance	
Edirisinghe Senanayake	50 m pistol	545	36	Did not advance	

== Swimming ==
Mayumi Raheem and Daniel Lee have been selected to represent Sri Lanka at the 2008 Summer Olympics in Swimming. Daniel Lee competed in the 50 m Freestyle, Heat 6 on Thursday, August 14.

Men

Athlete	Event	Heat		Semifinal		Final	
Athlete	Event	Time	Rank	Time	Rank	Time	Rank
Daniel Lee	50 m freestyle	24.92	66	Did not advance			

Women

Athlete	Event	Heat		Semifinal		Final	
Athlete	Event	Time	Rank	Time	Rank	Time	Rank
Mayumi Raheem	100 m breaststroke	1:15.33	44	Did not advance			

== Weightlifting ==
Chinthana Vidanage was given a Tripartite commission invitation to participate in the men's 69 kg class.

Athlete	Event	Snatch		Clean & Jerk		Total	Rank
Athlete	Event	Result	Rank	Result	Rank	Total	Rank
Chinthana Vidanage	Men's −69 kg	128	25	165	16	293	16

== Media coverage ==
The main rights to Olympic coverage in Sri Lanka are held by Rupavahini.

== See also ==
- Sri Lanka at the Olympics
- Sports in Sri Lanka
