= Ceylon at the 1972 Summer Olympics =

- IOC code: CEY

in Munich
- Competitors: 4 (4 men and 0 women) in 2 sports
- Flag bearer: Lucien Rosa
- Medals: Gold 0 Silver 0 Bronze 0 Total 0

Summer Olympics appearances (overview)
- 1948; 1952; 1956; 1960; 1964; 1968; 1972; 1976; 1980; 1984; 1988; 1992; 1996; 2000; 2004; 2008; 2012; 2016; 2020; 2024

Ceylon (in which renamed Sri Lanka earlier this year) competed at the 1972 Summer Olympics in Munich, West Germany. Four competitors, all men, took part in six events in two sports.

== Athletics ==
Men's 100 metres

- Sunil Gunawardene
  - First Heat – 11.00s (→ did not advance)
- Lucien Rosa
- Wickramesinghe Wimaladasa

== Shooting ==
One shooter represented Ceylon in 1972.

50 m rifle, prone

- Daya Rajasinghe Nadarajasingham
