= Sri Lanka at the 1988 Summer Olympics =

- IOC code: SRI
- NOC: National Olympic Committee of Sri Lanka

in Seoul
- Competitors: 6 (4 men and 2 women) in 3 sports
- Flag bearer: Daya Rajasinghe Nadarajasingham
- Medals: Gold 0 Silver 0 Bronze 0 Total 0

Summer Olympics appearances (overview)
- 1948; 1952; 1956; 1960; 1964; 1968; 1972; 1976; 1980; 1984; 1988; 1992; 1996; 2000; 2004; 2008; 2012; 2016; 2020; 2024

Sri Lanka competed at the 1988 Summer Olympics in Seoul, South Korea.

== Competitors ==
The following is the list of number of competitors in the Games.

Sport	Men	Women	Total
Athletics	1	1	2
Shooting	2	0	2
Swimming	1	1	2
Total	4	2	6

== Athletics ==
- Tilaka Jinadasa
- Vithanakande Samarasinghe

- Men's Marathon — 2:31.29 (→ 65th place)

== Shooting ==
- Daya Rajasinghe Nadarajasingham

== Swimming ==
- Julian Boiling

- Men's 400m Freestyle
    1. Heat – 4:18.88 (→ did not advance, 46th place)

- Men's 400m Individual Medley
    1. Heat – 4:53.61 (→ did not advance, 32nd place)

- Dipika Chanmugam

- Women's 100m Breaststroke
    1. Heat – 1:20.18 (→ did not advance, 38th place)

- Women's 200m Breaststroke
    1. Heat – 2:51.60 (→ did not advance, 42nd place)

- Women's 200m Individual Medley
    1. Heat – 2:33.58 (→ did not advance, 31st place)
