= Sri Lanka at the 1996 Summer Olympics =

- IOC code: SRI
- NOC: National Olympic Committee of Sri Lanka
- Website: www.srilankaolympic.org

in Atlanta
- Competitors: 9 in 3 sports
- Flag bearer: Sriyani Kulawansa
- Medals: Gold 0 Silver 0 Bronze 0 Total 0

Summer Olympics appearances (overview)
- 1948; 1952; 1956; 1960; 1964; 1968; 1972; 1976; 1980; 1984; 1988; 1992; 1996; 2000; 2004; 2008; 2012; 2016; 2020; 2024

Sri Lanka competed at the 1996 Summer Olympics in Atlanta, United States.

== Athletics ==
- Chintaki De Zoysa
- Benny Fernando (Note: full name: A. J. Tyronne Benildus Fernando)
- Susanthika Jayasinghe
- Sriyani Kulawansa
- Mahesh Perera
- Sugath Thilakaratne

== Diving ==
- Janaka Biyanwila

Men's 3m Springboard

- Preliminary Heat — 247.44 (→ did not advance, 35th place)

== Shooting ==
- Pushpamali Ramanayake
- Malini Wickramasinghe
- Luck Rajasinghe
