= Sri Lanka at the 1984 Summer Olympics =

- IOC code: SRI
- NOC: National Olympic Committee of Sri Lanka

in Los Angeles
- Competitors: 4 (4 men and 0 women) in 3 sports
- Flag bearer: Lalin Jirasinha
- Medals: Gold 0 Silver 0 Bronze 0 Total 0

Summer Olympics appearances (overview)
- 1948; 1952; 1956; 1960; 1964; 1968; 1972; 1976; 1980; 1984; 1988; 1992; 1996; 2000; 2004; 2008; 2012; 2016; 2020; 2024

Sri Lanka competed at the 1984 Summer Olympics in Los Angeles, United States.

== Sailing ==
- Ranil Dias
- Lalin Jirasinha

== Swimming ==
- Julian Bolling

- Men's 400m Freestyle
  - Heat — 4:23.42 (→ did not advance, 36th place)

- Men's 1500m Freestyle
  - Heat — 17:16.92 (→ did not advance, 27th place)

- Men's 400m Individual Medley
  - Heat — 5:02.88 (→ did not advance, 21st place)
