= Sri Lanka at the 2024 Summer Olympics =

- Flag of Sri Lanka
- IOC code: SRI
- NOC: National Olympic Committee of Sri Lanka
- Website: www.srilankaolympic.org

in Paris, France 26 July 2024 – 11 August 2024
- Competitors: 6 (3 men and 3 women) in 3 sports
- Flag bearers (opening): Viren Nettasinghe & Dilhani Lekamge
- Flag bearers (closing): Viren Nettasinghe & Dilhani Lekamge
- Medals: Gold 0 Silver 0 Bronze 0 Total 0

Summer Olympics appearances (overview)
- 1948; 1952; 1956; 1960; 1964; 1968; 1972; 1976; 1980; 1984; 1988; 1992; 1996; 2000; 2004; 2008; 2012; 2016; 2020; 2024

Sri Lanka competed at the 2024 Summer Olympics in Paris, France from 26 July to 11 August 2024. This marked Sri Lanka's nineteenth appearance at the Summer Olympics, with the exception of the 1976 Summer Olympics in Montreal. Seven of the nation's previous Olympic appearances were under the name Ceylon.

The Sri Lankan delegation consisted of six athletes (three male and female) competing in three sports. Badminton athlete Viren Nettasinghe and javelin thrower Dilhani Lekamge were the country's flagbearers during the opening ceremony.

== Competitors ==
The following is the list of number of competitors in the Games.

Sport	Men	Women	Total
Athletics	1	2	3
Badminton	1	0	1
Swimming	1	1	2
Total	3	3	6

== Athletics ==
Sri Lanka qualified three track and field athletes (one man and two women). Tharushi Karunarathna and Dilhani Lekamge both qualified directly through the World Rankings. Aruna Darshana qualified after receiving a reallocated quota spot. Athletes achieved qualified through their respective world rankings, in the following events:

Key

- Note–Ranks given for track events are within the athlete's heat only
- Q = Qualified for the next round
- q = Qualified for the next round as the fastest loser or, in field events, by position without achieving the qualifying target
- NR = National record
- N/A = Round not applicable for the event
- Bye = Athlete not required to compete in round

Track and road events

Athlete	Event	Heat		Repechage		Semifinal		Final	
Athlete	Event	Result	Rank	Result	Rank	Result	Rank	Result	Rank
Aruna Darshana	Men's 400 m	44.99 PB	3 Q	Bye		DSQ		Did not advance	
Tharushi Karunarathna	Women's 800 m	2:07.76	8	2:06.66	7	Did not advance			

Field events

Athlete	Event	Qualification		Final	
Athlete	Event	Result	Rank	Result	Rank
Dilhani Lekamge	Women's javelin throw	53.66	32	Did not advance	

== Badminton ==
Sri Lanka qualified one male badminton player through the BWF Race to Paris rankings as of April 30, 2024. At the age of 20, Viren Nettasinghe became the youngest badminton athlete to qualify for the Olympics from Sri Lanka.

Athlete	Event	Group stage			Round of 16	Quarter-final	Semi-final	Final / BM	
Athlete	Event	Opposition Score	Opposition Score	Rank in group	Opposition Score	Opposition Score	Opposition Score	Opposition Score	Rank
Viren Nettasinghe	Men's singles	Lee Z J (MAS); L (14–21, 12–21)	Abián (ESP); L (9–21, 19–21)	3	Did not advance				

== Swimming ==
Sri Lanka received two universality quota spots from FINA (one man and one woman). The Sri Lanka Aquatic Sports Union selected the highest ranked eligible swimmers in their respective events based on results at the 2024 World Aquatics Championships in Doha, Qatar.

Athlete	Event	Heat		Semifinal		Final	
Athlete	Event	Time	Rank	Time	Rank	Time	Rank
Kyle Abeysinghe	Men's 100 m freestyle	51.42	54	Did not advance			
Ganga Seneviratne	Women's 100 m backstroke	1:04.26	30	Did not advance			
