= Sri Lanka at the 2020 Summer Olympics =

- IOC code: SRI
- NOC: National Olympic Committee of Sri Lanka
- Website: www.srilankaolympic.org

in Tokyo, Japan July 23, 2021 – August 8, 2021
- Competitors: 9 in 7 sports
- Flag bearers (opening): Milka Gehani; Chamara Dharmawardana
- Flag bearer (closing): Yupun Abeykoon
- Officials: 17
- Medals: Gold 0 Silver 0 Bronze 0 Total 0

Summer Olympics appearances (overview)
- 1948; 1952; 1956; 1960; 1964; 1968; 1972; 1976; 1980; 1984; 1988; 1992; 1996; 2000; 2004; 2008; 2012; 2016; 2020; 2024

Sri Lanka competed at the 2020 Summer Olympics in Tokyo. Originally scheduled to take place from 24 July to 9 August 2020, the Games were postponed to 23 July to 8 August 2021, because of the COVID-19 pandemic. It was the nation's eighteenth appearance at the Summer Olympics, with the exception of the 1976 Summer Olympics in Montreal. Seven of the nation's previous Olympic appearances were under the name Ceylon.

On 4 July 2021, judoka Chamara Dharmawardana and artistic gymnast Milka Gehani were announced as Sri Lanka's flag-bearers during the opening ceremony. Yupun Abeykoon is the flag-bearer for the closing ceremony.

The Sri Lankan team of nine athletes (four men and five women) competed in seven sports along with 17 officials and coaches was announced on July 6, 2021. The country made its debut in the sports of artistic gymnastics and equestrian.

None of the athletes were able to advance to the next rounds in their events and Sri Lanka ended the Tokyo Olympics without a medal.

== Competitors ==
The following is the list of number of competitors in the Games.

Sport	Men	Women	Total
Athletics	1	1	2
Badminton	1	0	1
Equestrian	0	1	1
Gymnastics	0	1	1
Judo	1	0	1
Shooting	0	1	1
Swimming	1	1	2
Total	4	5	9

== Athletics ==
Sri Lanka entered two athletes. One Sri Lankan athlete, Yupun Abeykoon achieved the entry standard through the world ranking, while Nimali Liyanarachchi was awarded a universality spot.

Key

- Note–Ranks given for track events are within the athlete's heat only
- Q = Qualified for the next round
- q = Qualified for the next round as a fastest loser or, in field events, by position without achieving the qualifying target
- NR = National record
- N/A = Round not applicable for the event
- Bye = Athlete not required to compete in round

Track & road events

Athlete	Event	Heat		Quarterfinal		Semifinal		Final	
Athlete	Event	Result	Rank	Result	Rank	Result	Rank	Result	Rank
Yupun Abeykoon	Men's 100 m	Bye		10.32	6	Did not advance			
Nimali Liyanarachchi	Women's 800 m	2:10.23	8	—		Did not advance			

== Badminton ==
Sri Lanka received an invitation from the Tripartite Commission to send Niluka Karunaratne in the men's singles, to his third straight Olympics.

Athlete	Event	Group stage			Elimination	Quarterfinal	Semifinal	Final / BM	
Athlete	Event	Opposition Score	Opposition Score	Rank in Group	Opposition Score	Opposition Score	Opposition Score	Opposition Score	Rank
Niluka Karunaratne	Men's singles	Wang T-w (TPE); L (12–21, 15–21)	Nguyen (IRL); L (16–21, 14–21)	3	Did not advance				

== Equestrian ==
For the first time in history, Sri Lanka entered one jumping rider into the Olympic equestrian competition, by finishing in the top two of the individual FEI Olympic Rankings for Group G (Southeast Asia and Oceania). Mathilda Karlsson initially had a part of her qualifying points removed, following an administrative error from the FEI; however, the decision on points removal was subsequently overturned by the Court of Arbitration for Sport.

=== Jumping ===
Athlete	Horse	Event	Qualification		Final		
Athlete	Horse	Event	Penalties	Rank	Penalties	Time	Rank
Mathilda Karlsson	Chopin	Individual	Eliminated		Did not advance		

== Gymnastics ==
=== Artistic ===
With the cancellation of the 2021 Asian Championships in Hangzhou, China, Milka Gehani secured a spot as the highest-ranked gymnast from Asia at the 2019 World Artistic Gymnastics Championships in Stuttgart, Germany not already qualified.

Women

Athlete	Event	Qualification						Final					
Athlete	Event	Apparatus				Total	Rank	Apparatus				Total	Rank
Athlete	Event	V	UB	BB	F	Total	Rank	V	UB	BB	F	Total	Rank
Milka Gehani	All-around	13.366	10.866	11.266	10.300	45.798	78	Did not advance					

== Judo ==
Sri Lanka received an invitation from the Tripartite Commission to send Chamara Dharmawardana in the men's lightweight category (73 kg).

Athlete	Event	Round of 64	Round of 32	Round of 16	Quarterfinals	Semifinals	Repechage	Final / BM	
Athlete	Event	Opposition Result	Opposition Result	Opposition Result	Opposition Result	Opposition Result	Opposition Result	Opposition Result	Rank
Chamara Dharmawardana	Men's −73 kg	Bye	Houssein (DJI); L 00–10	Did not advance					

== Shooting ==
Sri Lanka received an invitation from the Tripartite Commission to send a women's rifle shooter to the Olympics, as long as the minimum qualifying score (MQS) was fulfilled by June 5, 2021.

Athlete	Event	Qualification		Final	
Athlete	Event	Points	Rank	Points	Rank
Tehani Egodawela	Women's 10 m air rifle	611.5	49	Did not advance	

== Swimming ==
Sri Lanka received two universality invitations from FINA to send two top-ranked swimmers (one per gender in their respective individual events to the Olympics, based on the FINA Points System of June 28, 2021.

Athlete	Event	Heat		Semifinal		Final	
Athlete	Event	Time	Rank	Time	Rank	Time	Rank
Matthew Abeysinghe	Men's 100 m freestyle	50.62	48	Did not advance			
Aniqah Gaffoor	Women's 100 m butterfly	1:05.33	32	Did not advance			

== See also ==
- Sri Lanka at the 2018 Commonwealth Games
- Sri Lanka at the 2018 Asian Games
- Sri Lanka at the 2020 Summer Paralympics
