= Ceylon at the 1956 Summer Olympics =

- IOC code: CEY

in Melbourne/Stockholm
- Competitors: 3 in 2 sports
- Medals: Gold 0 Silver 0 Bronze 0 Total 0

Summer Olympics appearances (overview)
- 1948; 1952; 1956; 1960; 1964; 1968; 1972; 1976; 1980; 1984; 1988; 1992; 1996; 2000; 2004; 2008; 2012; 2016; 2020; 2024

Ceylon competed at the 1956 Summer Olympics in Melbourne, Australia.

== Athletics ==
High jump

- Nagalingam Ethirveerasingam
  - Finals

== Boxing ==
- Chandrasena Jayasuriya
- Hempala Jayasuriya
