= Sri Lanka at the 1992 Summer Olympics =

- IOC code: SRI
- NOC: National Olympic Committee of Sri Lanka

in Barcelona
- Competitors: 11 (5 men and 6 women) in 5 sports
- Medals: Gold 0 Silver 0 Bronze 0 Total 0

Summer Olympics appearances (overview)
- 1948; 1952; 1956; 1960; 1964; 1968; 1972; 1976; 1980; 1984; 1988; 1992; 1996; 2000; 2004; 2008; 2012; 2016; 2020; 2024

Sri Lanka was represented at the 1992 Summer Olympics in Barcelona, Catalonia, Spain by the National Olympic Committee of Sri Lanka.

In total, 11 athletes including five men and six women represented Sri Lanka in five different sports including athletics, badminton, shooting, swimming and weightlifting.

== Competitors ==
In total, 11 athletes represented Sri Lanka at the 1992 Summer Olympics in Barcelona, Catalonia, Spain across five different sports.

Sport	Men	Women	Total
Athletics	2	5	7
Badminton	1	0	1
Shooting	0	1	1
Swimming	1	0	1
Weightlifting	1	–	1
Total	5	6	11

== Athletics ==
In total, seven Sri Lankan athletes participated in the athletics events – Vijitha Amerasekera in the women's javelin throw, Damayanthi Dharsha in the women's 100 m and the women's 200 m, Sriyantha Dissanayake in the men's 100 m and the men's 200 m, Jayamini Illeperuma in the women's 400 m, Kuruppu Karunaratne in the men's marathon, Sriyani Kulawansa in the women's 100 m hurdles and the women's high jump and Sriyani Dhammika Menike in the women's 800 m and the women's 1,500 m.

The heats for the women's 100 m took place on 31 July 1992. Dharsha finished seventh in her heat in a time of 11.88 seconds and she did not advance to the quarter-finals.

The heats for the men's 100 m took place on 31 July 1992. Dissanayake finished fifth in his heat in a time of 10.87 seconds and he did not advance to the quarter-finals.

The heats for the women's 800 m took place on 31 July 1992. Manike finished sixth in her heat in a time of two minutes 3.85 seconds and she did not advance to the semi-finals.

The qualifying round for the women's javelin throw took place on 31 July 1992. Amerasekera contested qualifying group A. Her best throw of 48 m was not enough to advance to the final and she finished 24th overall.

The heats for the women's 400 m took place on 1 August 1992. Illeperuma finished fourth in her heat in a time of 54.14 seconds as she advanced to the quarter-finals. The quarter-finals took place on 2 August 1992. Illeperuma finished seventh in her quarter-final in a time of 53.55 seconds and she did not advance to the semi-finals.

The heats for the women's 200 m took place on 3 August 1992. Dharsha finished fourth in her heat in a time of 23.82 seconds as she advanced to the quarter-finals. The quarter-finals took place later the same day. Dharsha finished seventh in her quarter-final in a time of 23.89 seconds and she did not advance to the semi-finals.

The heats for the men's 200 m took place on 3 August 1992. Dissanayake finished seventh in his heat in a time of 21.61 seconds and he did not advance to the quarter-finals.

The heats for the women's 1,500 m took place on 5 August 1992. Manike finished eighth in her heat in a time of four minutes 26.22 seconds and she did not advance to the semi-finals.

The heats for the women's 100 m hurdles took place on 5 August 1992. Kulawansa finished sixth in her heat in a time of 13.55 seconds and she did not advance to the quarter-finals.

The qualifying round for the women's high jump took place on 6 August 1992. Kulawansa did not start.

The men's marathon took place on 9 August 1992. Karunaratne completed the course in a time of two hours 32 minutes 26 seconds to finish 71st overall.

== Badminton ==
In total, one Sri Lankan athlete participated in the badminton events – Niroshan Wijekoon in the men's singles.

The first round of the men's singles took place on 28 July 1992. Wijekoon lost 15–9 15–11 to Hannes Fuchs of Austria.

== Shooting ==
In total, one Sri Lankan athletes participated in the shooting events – Pushpamali Ramanayake in the women's 10 metre air rifle.

The preliminary round for the women's 10 metre air rifle took place on 26 July 1992. Across the four rounds, Ramanayake scored 382 points. She did not advance to the final and finished joint 37th overall.

== Swimming ==
In total, one Sri Lankan athletes participated in the swimming events – Julian Bolling in the men's 100 m butterfly, the men's 200 m butterfly and the men's 200 m freestyle.

The heats for the men's 200 m freestyle took place on 26 July 1992. Bolling finished fourth in his heat in a time of two minutes 2.01 seconds which was ultimately not fast enough to advance to the finals.

The heats for the men's 100 m butterfly took place on 27 July 1992. Bolling finished fifth in his heat in a time of one minute 1.63 seconds which was ultimately not fast enough to advance to the finals.

The heats for the men's 200 m butterfly took place on 30 July 1992. Bolling finished fifth in his heat in a time of two minutes 17.47 seconds which was ultimately not fast enough to advance to the finals.

== Weightlifting ==
In total, one Sri Lankan athletes participated in the weightlifting events – Ansela Marlen Wijewickrema in the –52 kg.

The −52 kg took place on 26 July 1992. Wijewickrema lifted 95 kg (snatch) and 117.5 kg (clean and jerk) for a combined score of 212.5 kg which placed him 12th in the overall rankings.
