= Mangala Samarakoon =

Sri Lankan sport shooter

Personal information
- Nationality: Sri Lankan
- Born: 26 August 1980 (age 46) Nuwara Eliya, Madhyama, Central Province, Sri Lanka
- Education: Madawala Maha Vidyalaya, Uva Paranagama

Sport
- Country: Sri Lanka
- Sport: Shooting
Medal record
Men's shooting
Representing Sri Lanka
South Asian Games
| Gold medal – first place | 2006 Colombo | 50m rifle prone team |
| Bronze medal – third place | 2016 Guwahati | 50m rifle prone team |

Samarakoon Mudiyansalage Mangala Samarakoon (born 26 August 1980) is a former Sri Lankan sport shooter. He also served as a non-commission officer for Sri Lanka Army as well staff sergeant of the Sri Lanka Army Service Corps.

== Early life and education ==
Mangala was born in Nuwara Eliya in Central Province as the only child in his family. His father was primarily involved in farming as his family's main source of income was based on farming. He was educated at the Madawala Maha Vidyalaya in Uva Paranagama where he also pursued his athletics career.

== Career ==
After completing his primary and secondary education at the Madawala Maha Vidyalaya, Mangala joined Sri Lanka Army on 18 January 2000 initially to pursue his training in athletics. However, he soon switched to the sport of shooting a year later after being spotted for his talent for shooting during military training. He was also coached by former veteran sport shooter Pushpamali Ramanayake for several years.

After taking the sport of shooting in 2001, he began competing in several international competitions including the South Asian Games, Asian Games, Commonwealth Games and the Olympics. He made his mark in the sport of shooting after claiming a gold medal in the men's 50m rifle prone event during the 2006 South Asian Games. He also went onto represent Sri Lanka at the 2006 Asian Games, 2010 Asian Games, 2010 Commonwealth Games, 2012 Summer Olympics, 2014 Commonwealth Games, 2016 South Asian Games, 2016 Summer Olympics and 2019 South Asian Games.

He competed at the 2012 Summer Olympics representing Sri Lanka in the men's 10 metre air rifle and men's 50 metre rifle prone which was also his maiden Olympic appearance. He failed to advance in both. Samarakoon also represented Sri Lanka at the 2016 Summer Olympics which was held in Rio de Janeiro. During the 2016 Summer Olympics, he blamed the Sri Lanka Shooting Sports Federation for failing to provide him a suitable shooting kit which made his participation quite difficult when he was slotted to compete in the men's 10m air rifle event. He was settled only for 50th position in the men's 10m air rifle event during the Rio Olympics.
