= Sri Lanka at the 1980 Summer Olympics =

- IOC code: SRI
- NOC: National Olympic Committee of Sri Lanka
- Website: www.srilankaolympic.org

in Moscow
- Competitors: 4 (4 men and 0 women) in 1 sport
- Medals: Gold 0 Silver 0 Bronze 0 Total 0

Summer Olympics appearances (overview)
- 1948; 1952; 1956; 1960; 1964; 1968; 1972; 1976; 1980; 1984; 1988; 1992; 1996; 2000; 2004; 2008; 2012; 2016; 2020; 2024

Sri Lanka competed at the 1980 Summer Olympics in Moscow, USSR. From 1948 to 1972, the nation was known as Ceylon at the Olympic Games.

== Athletics ==
Men's 4×400 metres Relay

- Dharmasena Samararatne, Kosala Sahabandu, Newton Perera, and Appunidage Premachandra

- Heat — 3:14.4 (→ did not advance)
