= Geoffrey Marks =

Sri Lankan swimmer

Personal information
- Full name: Geoffrey Charles Marks
- Born: 2 January 1932 Colombo, Ceylon
- Died: 30 August 1990 (aged 58) Melbourne, Australia

Sport
- Sport: Swimming

Geoffrey Charles Marks (2 January 1932 – 30 August 1990) was a Sri Lankan swimmer. He competed in three events at the 1952 Summer Olympics.
