= Nagalingam Ethirveerasingam =

Sri Lankan high jumper (1934–2024)

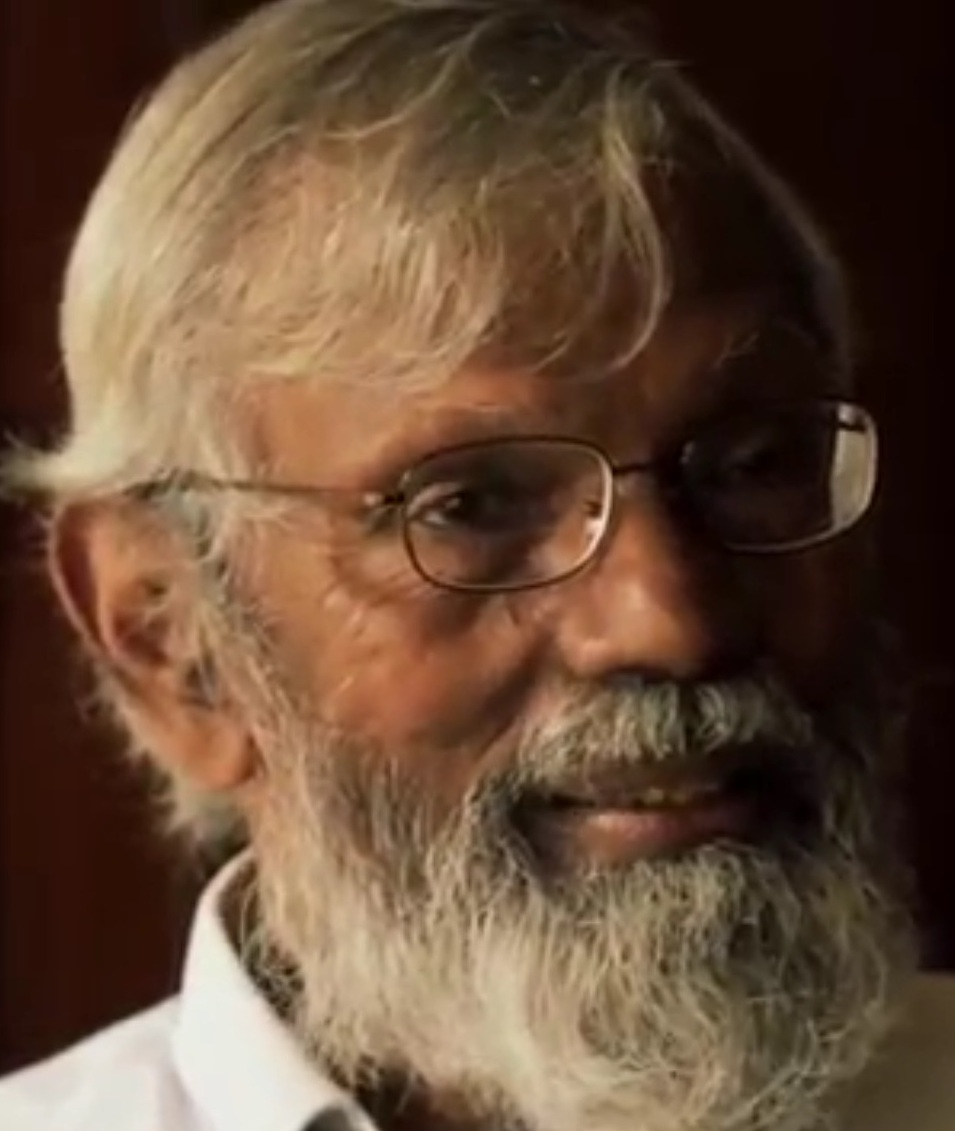

Personal information
- Native name: நாகலிங்கம் எதிர்வீரசிங்கம்
- Born: 24 August 1934 Ilavalai, British Ceylon
- Died: 18 April 2024 (aged 89) Los Angeles, California, U.S.
- Occupations: Athlete, lecturer
- Height: 189 cm (6 ft 2 in)
- Weight: 73 kg (161 lb)

Sport
- Country: Ceylon
- Sport: Track and field
- Event: High jump

Nagalingam Ethirveerasingam
Medal record

Men's athletics

Representing Ceylon

Asian Games
Gold medal – first place	1958 Japan	High jump
Silver medal – second place	1962 Indonesia	High jump

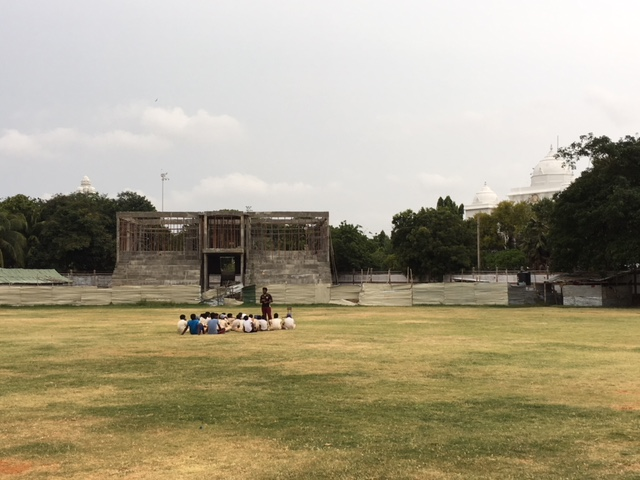
A pavilion under construction at the Jaffna Central College grounds which was named after Dr. Nagalingam Ethirveerasingam.

Nagalingam Ethirveerasingam (Tamil: நாகலிங்கம் எதிர்வீரசிங்கம்; 24 August 1934 – 18 April 2024) was a Sri Lankan athlete who represented Ceylon at the 1952 and 1956 Summer Olympic Games. Ethirveerasingam also participated in three Asian Games: 1954 (Manila), 1958 (Tokyo), and 1962 (Djakarta).

He won the high jump gold medal at the 1958 Tokyo Asian Games, which was the first gold medal won by Sri Lanka in the Asian Games and in any major multi-sport international event.

At the 1962 Djakarta Asian Games he took home the Silver Medal. He was co-record holder at the 1954 Manila Asian Games after jumping the same height (1.95 meters) as the gold, silver, and bronze jumpers, but came fourth due to having more misses than the other athletes. Ethirveerasingam finished 11th in the 1958 British Empire and Commonwealth Games high jump.

== Early life and career ==
Ethirveerasingam was born on 24 August 1934. He was a student at Jaffna Central College, where apart from his accomplishments in athletics, he was also a cricketer, a feat often overshadowed by his more notable athletic achievements. He competed for the UCLA Bruins track and field team in the high jump at the 1959 and 1960 conference championships. He was also an All-American at the 1960 NCAA track and field championships, finishing 7th.

Ethirveerasingam stood 189 cm (6 ft 2+1/2 in) tall and weighed 73 kg (161 lb) during his athletic career.

He taught at universities in Sierra Leone, Papua New Guinea, Nigeria and Sri Lanka. He also worked for UNESCO for five years.

In later years whilst lecturing in Sierra Leone, he captained the university cricket team in the local cricket tournament and in 1973 was appointed vice captain of the national team that played against the neighbouring country of Gambia. Ethirveerasingam received a PhD and wrote several books, one being The Effect of Advance Presentation of Organizers On Complex Verbal Learning and Retention by Vocational Agriculture Students in New York State.

Ethirveerasingam died in Los Angeles on 18 April 2024, at the age of 89.

== See also ==
- Duncan White
- Susanthika Jayasinghe
