= Ceylon at the 1964 Summer Olympics =

- IOC code: CEY

in Tokyo
- Competitors: 6 in 4 sports
- Medals: Gold 0 Silver 0 Bronze 0 Total 0

Summer Olympics appearances (overview)
- 1948; 1952; 1956; 1960; 1964; 1968; 1972; 1976; 1980; 1984; 1988; 1992; 1996; 2000; 2004; 2008; 2012; 2016; 2020; 2024; 2028

Ceylon competed at the 1964 Summer Olympics in Tokyo, Japan. Six competitors, all men, took part in six events in four sports.

== Athletics ==
- Ranatunge Karunananda

== Boxing ==
- Malcolm Bulner
- Winston Van Cuylenburg

== Shooting ==
Two shooters represented Sri Lanka in 1964.

50 m rifle, prone

- Ravivimal Jaywardene
- Habarakadage Perera

== Wrestling ==
- Ernest Fernando
