= Ceylon at the 1960 Summer Olympics =

- IOC code: CEY

in Rome
- Competitors: 5 in 4 sports
- Medals: Gold 0 Silver 0 Bronze 0 Total 0

Summer Olympics appearances (overview)
- 1948; 1952; 1956; 1960; 1964; 1968; 1972; 1976; 1980; 1984; 1988; 1992; 1996; 2000; 2004; 2008; 2012; 2016; 2020; 2024

Ceylon competed at the 1960 Summer Olympics in Rome, Italy. Five competitors, all men, took part in five events in four sports.

== Athletics ==
- Linus Diaz

== Boxing ==
- Weerakoon Dharmasiri
- Mohandas Liyanage Sumith

== Cycling ==
One cyclist represented Ceylon in 1960.

Individual road race

- Maurice Coomarawel

== Swimming ==
Men

Athlete	Event	Heat		Semifinal		Final	
Athlete	Event	Time	Rank	Time	Rank	Time	Rank
Tony Williams	200 m breaststroke	2:59.8	39	Did not advance			
