= Ceylon at the 1968 Summer Olympics =

- IOC code: CEY (CEI used at these Games)

in Mexico City
- Competitors: 3 (3 men and 0 women) in 3 sports
- Medals: Gold 0 Silver 0 Bronze 0 Total 0

Summer Olympics appearances (overview)
- 1948; 1952; 1956; 1960; 1964; 1968; 1972; 1976; 1980; 1984; 1988; 1992; 1996; 2000; 2004; 2008; 2012; 2016; 2020; 2024

Ceylon competed at the 1968 Summer Olympics in Mexico City, Mexico.

== Athletics ==
- Wimalasena Perera

== Boxing ==
Men's Light Flyweight (– 48 kg)

- Hatha Karunaratne
  - First Round — Bye
  - Second Round — Defeated They Lay (BUR), 5:0
  - Quarterfinals — Lost to Francisco Rodríguez (VEN), TKO-2

== Sailing ==
- Ray Wijewardene
