= Ceylon at the 1948 Summer Olympics =

- IOC code: CEY
- NOC: Ceylon Olympic and Empire Games Association

in London
- Competitors: 7 in 2 sports
- Flag bearer: Duncan White
- Medals Ranked 28th: Gold 0 Silver 1 Bronze 0 Total 1

Summer Olympics appearances (overview)
- 1948; 1952; 1956; 1960; 1964; 1968; 1972; 1976; 1980; 1984; 1988; 1992; 1996; 2000; 2004; 2008; 2012; 2016; 2020; 2024; 2028

Ceylon competed in the Summer Olympic Games for the first time at the 1948 Summer Olympics in London, England.

== Medalists ==
Medal	Name	Sport	Event
Silver	Duncan White	Athletics	Men's 400 metres hurdles

== Athletics ==
- John De Saram
- G. D. Peiris
- Duncan White

== Boxing ==
- Eddie Gray
- Leslie Handunge
- Alex Obeysekera
- Albert Perera
