= Anuradha Cooray =

Sri Lankan long-distance runner

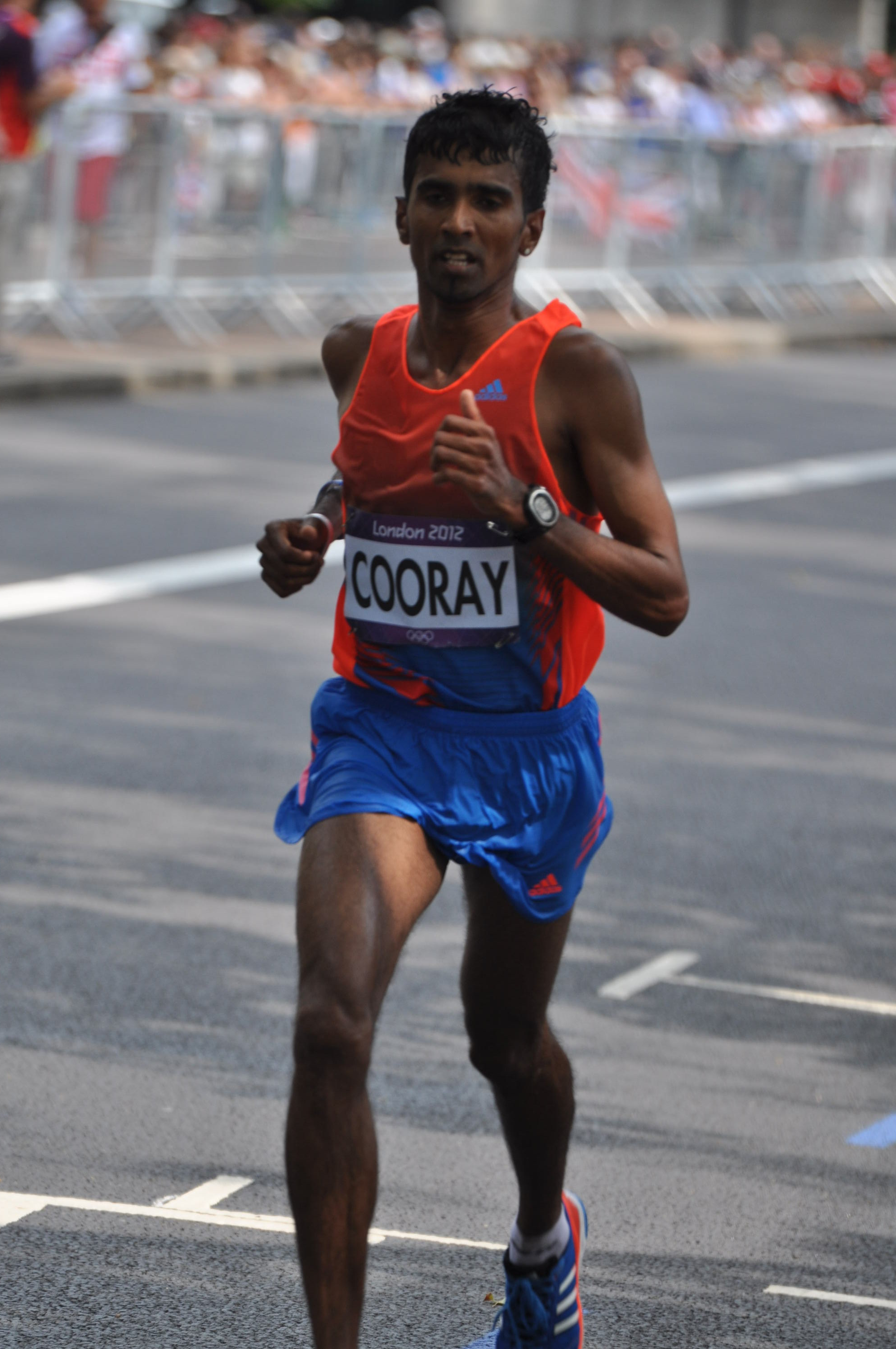
- Cooray in the marathon at the 2012 Olympics in London

Personal information
- Full name: Anuradha Indrajith Cooray
- Nationality: Sri Lankan
- Born: March 24, 1978 (age 48) Divulapitiya, Gampaha, Sri Lanka
- Height: 1.74 m (5 ft 8 1/2 in)
- Weight: 58 kg (128 lb)

Sport
- Country: Sri Lanka
- Sport: Athletics
- Event: Marathon
- Coached by: Nick Taylor
- Updated on 12 August 2012

Anuradha Indrajith Cooray (born March 24, 1978) is a Sri Lankan marathon runner. Cooray was a competitor at the 2004 Olympic games, finishing 30th out of 113 in the marathon with a time of 2:19:24.

He won the gold medal in the marathon at the SAF games in Pakistan in 2004. He had previously been a 5000 and 10000 m runner.

Cooray is Sri Lanka's national record holder in the men's marathon and 10,000 metres and brings back memories of K.A. Karunaratne. Cooray started his running career as a 5000m runner at Divulapitiya Central College. He joined the Sri Lankan army in 1999, coming under the brigadier Perry Liyanage. Cooray reached his peak at the 2004 South Asian Games in Islamabad, April 2004, where he clocked two hours, 16 minutes, 36 seconds to secure the gold medal. Cooray's main aim was to compete in the Athens Olympics with a personal best. However he finished eight minutes and 29 seconds behind the gold medalist Stefano Baldini (2:10:55).

Anuradha is currently living in Buckinghamshire, running again and competing for the Vale of Aylesbury Athletic Club. He represented Sri Lanka at the London 2012 Olympics in the marathon in 55th place. He also competed in the Rio 2016 Olympics in the marathon finishing in a time of 2:17:06 in 34th place. At the time of the London Olympics, he worked at Greggs in Aylesbury.

== Career Best Records ==
- Men's marathon in 2 hours, 13 minutes, 47 seconds (National Record)
- Men's Half-Marathon 1 hour, 4 minutes, 45 seconds (National Record)
- Men's 10,000m in 29 minutes, 32 seconds

== London Marathon ==
- 2015 - Cooray produced the performance of his life in this year's event to finish 14th in what was not only a new personal best by just over two minutes, but also a new national record with a time of 2 hours 13 minutes 47 seconds, breaking the previous record of 2 hours 14 minutes 31 seconds set by Lucien Rosa in the 1975 Fukuoka Marathon.
- 2013 - Cooray was able to complete the London Marathon 2013 taking the 14th place in 2 hours 17 minutes and 53 seconds. The event was contested by 35,000 participants. Considering his last year's performance this is an advancement for him considering the position he finished and an indication of Cooray is still very much in the rhythm.
- 2012 - On the 32nd event of London Marathon, Cooray managed to complete in 23rd place out of 37,500 participants with a timing of 2 hours 17 minutes and 50 seconds.

== Asian Championships ==
- Fifth in men's 10,000m in Jakarta, Indonesia in 2000
- Fourth in men's 10,000m in Colombo, Sri Lanka in 2002
- Second in men's 10,000m in Kathmandu, Nepal in 1999
- First in men's marathon in Islamabad, Pakistan in 2004

== Open Meets ==
- Won the Singapore International Open in - 2001, 2002 and 2003

Olympic Games
| Preceded by Niluka Karunaratne | Flagbearer for Sri Lanka; Rio de Janeiro 2016 | Succeeded by Incumbent |
