= Daya Rajasinghe Nadarajasingham =

Sri Lankan sports shooter

Personal information
- Born: 26 May 1948 (age 78)

Sport
- Sport: Sports shooting

Daya Rajasinghe Nadarajasingham (born 26 May 1948) is a Sri Lankan former sports shooter. He competed at the 1972 Summer Olympics and the 1988 Summer Olympics.
