= Sri Lanka at the Olympics =

- IOC code: SRI
- NOC: National Olympic Committee of Sri Lanka
- Website: www.olympic.lk
- Medals Ranked 126th: Gold 0 Silver 2 Bronze 0 Total 2

Summer appearances
- 1948; 1952; 1956; 1960; 1964; 1968; 1972; 1976; 1980; 1984; 1988; 1992; 1996; 2000; 2004; 2008; 2012; 2016; 2020; 2024

Sri Lanka first participated at the Olympic Games in 1948, and has sent a delegation to every Summer Olympic Games except for the 1976 Games to boycott apartheid South Africa. The nation has never participated in the Winter Olympic Games.

Sri Lankan athletes have won a total of two Olympic silver medals, both in athletics.

The National Olympic Committee of Sri Lanka was created in 1937 and recognized by the International Olympic Committee that same year. The nation was designated as Ceylon (country code "CEY") until 1972.

Parami Wasanthi Maristela won Sri Lanka's first ever Youth Olympics medal, a bronze in the girls' 2000 metre steeplechase athletics event at the 2018 Summer Youth Olympics.

== Medal tables ==
=== Medals by Games ===
Games	Athletes	Gold	Silver	Bronze	Total	Rank
1948 London	7	0	1	0	1	28
1952 Helsinki	5	0	0	0	0	–
1956 Melbourne	3	0	0	0	0	–
1960 Rome	5	0	0	0	0	–
1964 Tokyo	6	0	0	0	0	–
1968 Mexico City	3	0	0	0	0	–
1972 Munich	4	0	0	0	0	–
1980 Moscow	4	0	0	0	0	–
1984 Los Angeles	4	0	0	0	0	–
1988 Seoul	6	0	0	0	0	–
1992 Barcelona	11	0	0	0	0	–
1996 Atlanta	9	0	0	0	0	–
2000 Sydney	18	0	1	0	1	64
2004 Athens	8	0	0	0	0	–
2008 Beijing	8	0	0	0	0	–
2012 London	7	0	0	0	0	–
2016 Rio de Janeiro	9	0	0	0	0	–
2020 Tokyo	9	0	0	0	0	–
2024 Paris	6	0	0	0	0	–
2028 Los Angeles	future event					
2032 Brisbane	future event					
Total		0	2	0	2	126

=== Medals by sport ===
Sport	Gold	Silver	Bronze	Total
Athletics	0	2	0	2
Totals (1 entries)	0	2	0	2

== List of medalists ==
Medal	Name	Games	Sport	Event
(silver) Silver	Duncan White	(United Kingdom) London 1948	Athletics	Men's 400 metre hurdles
(silver) Silver	Susanthika Jayasinghe	(Australia) Sydney 2000	Athletics	Women's 200 metres

== See also ==
- List of flag bearers for Sri Lanka at the Olympics
- Category:Olympic competitors for Sri Lanka
- All-time Olympic Games medal count
- Sri Lanka at the Paralympics
