= Lucien Rosa =

Sri Lankan track and field athlete

Medal record

Men's athletics

Representing Sri Lanka

Asian Games
Gold medal – first place	1970 Bangkok	5000 m
Gold medal – first place	1970 Bangkok	10,000 m
Bronze medal – third place	1966 Bangkok	5000 m
Bronze medal – third place	1966 Bangkok	10,000 m

Sellappuliyage Lucian Benedict Rosa (better known as SLB Rosa, born 11 February 1944) is a Sri Lankan former long-distance runner. He represented Sri Lanka at the 1972 Summer Olympics held in Munich, Germany. He is best known for running barefooted and winning a 5000 metres and the 10,000 metres double at the 1970 Asian Games held in Bangkok, Thailand. His performance in the 10,000 metres was also an Asian Games record.

At the Asian Games in Bangkok in 1966, he won the bronze medal in both 5000 metres and 10,000 metres. His personal best performance in the 10,000 metres, 29:18.0 minutes, still stands as the Sri Lankan national record since 1975. Born in Kandy, Rosa started his athletic career at Roman Catholic School, Ampitiya. Later, he joined the Army and continued to pursue athletics. He led the Sri Lankan team in the 1972 Olympics but could not compete in the 1976 edition due to Sri Lanka boycotting the Montreal Olympics. He was in Ceylon Olympic squad in 1968 but country sent only a three-man team, which did not include Lucian, to Mexico due to financial difficulties.

Rosa is a University of Wisconsin–Parkside Hall of Famer, and a men's cross-country and track coach from 1977-2007. He won the Drake Relays marathon three times (1972, 1973, and 1975). Lucian Rosa Invitational is named after him.
