= Susanthika Jayasinghe =

Sri Lankan sprinter

Deshabandu Susanthika Jayasinghe
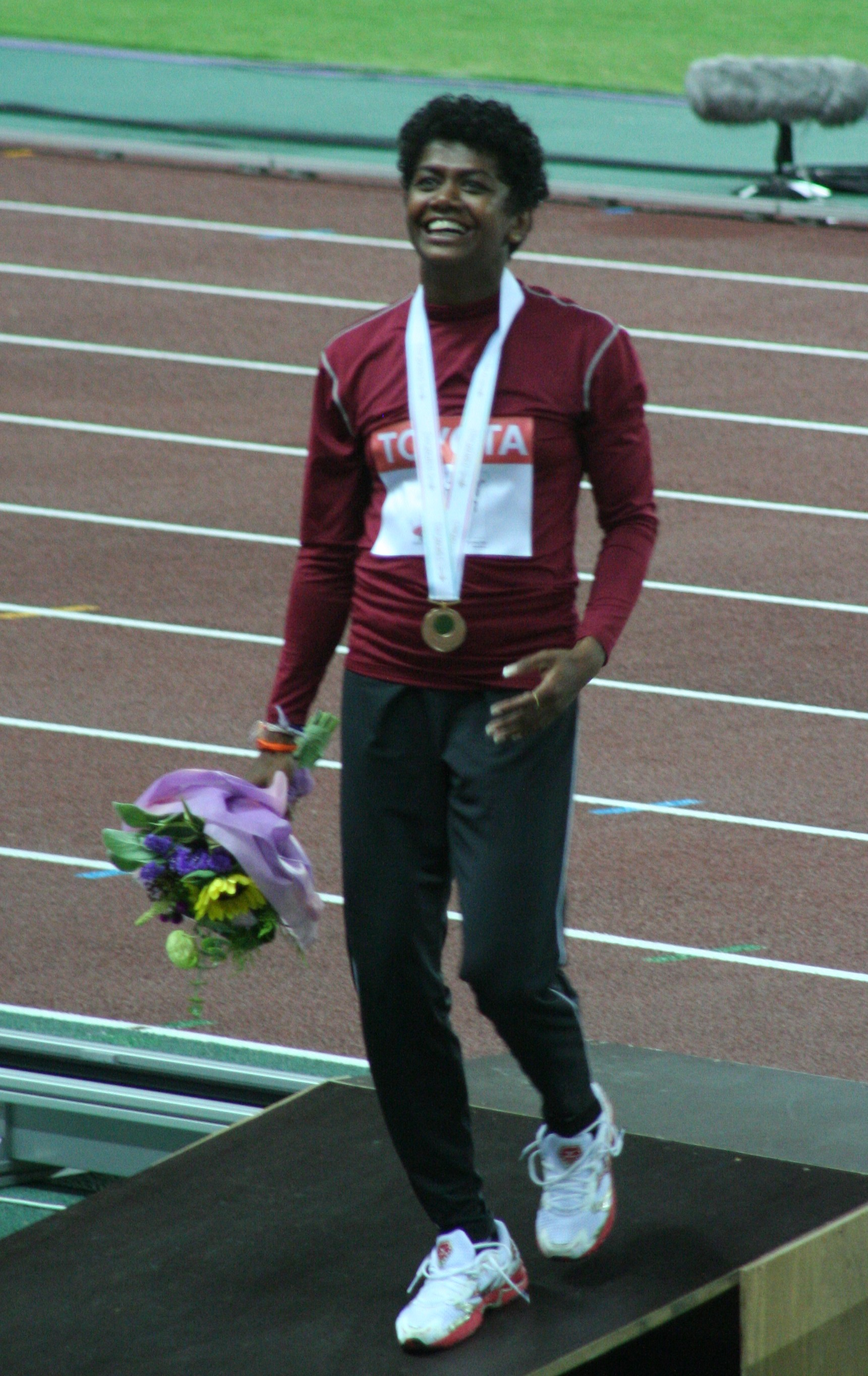
- Jayasinghe at the 2007 World Championships

Personal information
- Native name: සුසන්තිකා ජයසිංහ
- Nickname: Asian black Mare
- Nationality: Sri Lankan
- Born: December 17, 1975 (age 50) Uduwaka, Sri Lanka
- Occupation: Sprinter
- Years active: 1994–2009

Sport
- Country: Sri Lanka
- Sport: Track and field
- Event: Sprint
- International level: 1994
- Retired: 5 February 2009

Achievements and titles
- Olympic finals: 2000 Sydney
- Personal bests: 100 m: 11.04 September 9, 2000 (Yokohama, Japan); 200 m: 22.28 September 28, 2000 (Sydney, Australia)
Medal record
Women's athletics
Representing Sri Lanka
Event	1st	2nd	3rd
Olympic Games	0	1	0
World Championships	0	1	1
Continental Cup	0	1	1
Asian Games	1	2	1
Asian Championships	6	1	0
Lusophony Games	2	0	0
South Asian Games	4	0	0
Total	9	6	3
Event	1st	2nd	3rd
100 m	4	3	0
200 m	4	3	3
4 × 100 m relay	1	0	0
Olympic Games
Silver medal – second place	2000 Sydney	200 m
World Championships
Silver medal – second place	1997 Athens	200 m
Bronze medal – third place	2007 Osaka	200 m
Continental Cup
Silver medal – second place	2002 Madrid	100 m
Bronze medal – third place	2002 Madrid	200 m
Asian Games
Gold medal – first place	2002 Busan	100 m
Silver medal – second place	1994 Hiroshima	200 m
Silver medal – second place	2006 Doha	100 m
Bronze medal – third place	2006 Doha	200 m
Asian Championships
Gold medal – first place	1995 Jakarta	200 m
Gold medal – first place	2000 Jakarta	4 × 100 m
Gold medal – first place	2002 Colombo	100 m
Gold medal – first place	2002 Colombo	200 m
Gold medal – first place	2007 Amman	100 m
Gold medal – first place	2007 Amman	200 m
Silver medal – second place	1995 Jakarta	100 m
Lusophony Games
Gold medal – first place	2006 Macao	100 m
Gold medal – first place	2006 Macao	200 m
South Asian Games
Gold medal – first place	1995 Chennai	100 m
Gold medal – first place	1995 Chennai	200 m
Gold medal – first place	2004 Islamabad	200 m
Gold medal – first place	2006 Colombo	200 m
- Updated on 7 September 2021

Deshabandu Kameradin Susanthika Jayasinghe (Sinhala: සුසන්තිකා ජයසිංහ; Tamil: சுசந்திகா ஜயசிங்ஹ, born December 17, 1975) is a Sri Lankan retired sprinter, who specialised in the 100 and 200 metres. She won the Olympic silver medal for the 200 m event in the 2000 Summer Olympics in Sydney, the second Sri Lankan to win an Olympic medal after Duncan White and the first Asian woman to win an Olympic or World Championship medal in a sprint event. She is also the only Asian athlete to have claimed an Olympic medal in sprint events. She is also the first and only Sri Lankan to win a medal at the World Athletics Championships. Her silver medal achievement at the 2000 Sydney Olympics also stood as the only Olympic medal for a South Asian in athletics event for 21 years before Neeraj Chopra's gold medal achievement at the 2020 Summer Olympics for India. She is fondly nicknamed as the Asian Black Mare. She has represented Sri Lanka at the Olympics on three occasions in 1996, 2000 and 2008. She is considered one of the most decorated sprinters in Sri Lanka. However, she is also a deemed as a controversial figure in Sri Lanka.

She became a victim of politics during the peak of her career as many politicians and sports officials attempted to take credit for her medal achievements despite not supporting her prior to competing at the events. She was embroiled in political controversies including a series of false doping allegations, standoff with politicians, seven year old murder trials against her former spouse and sexual harassment. She was also sidelined for major part of her career due to injury concerns and also endured a troubled marriage life.

== Early years ==
Jayasinghe was born in Ethnawala, Warakapola, Uduwaka, Sri Lanka. She was born as the fifth and youngest child in her family. She was brought up in a poor family in a small village 60 kilometres north of Colombo, where running spikes cost more than the average month's wage, she had no access to proper sports equipment or coaches.

Her father who served as a bus driver at the Ceylon Transport Board had eventually lost his job by the time she was born. The burden fell on the shoulders of her mother who cut rubber trees to run the family. Later on Susanthika too lent a helping hand to her family by rolling beedi. She earned around Rs. 22.50 by selling about 15000 beedis within four days. Despite the financial tussles, she pursued her primary education at the Uduwaka Junior School. She later switched to Athnawala Maha Vidyalaya to continue her studies.

She was encouraged to take up athletics by an army officer who watched her closely when she was running in an inter-school competition at the age of 16. The army officer who watched her event as a spectator recommended her to join Sri Lanka Army soon after completing the school education. She agreed his offer and signed up as a volunteer recruit and also trained hard in athletics while being attached with the army.

She enlisted in the Sri Lanka Army Volunteer Force to pursue her athletic career, and was attached to the 3rd Battalion, Sri Lanka Army Women's Corps (SLAWC) as a Private. In 1994, she competed in the All Island Athletic Championship from a team from the SLAWC and won the best player trophy.

== Professional athletics career ==
She rose to prominence at the age of 18 after claiming a gold in 200 m and a silver in 100 m events during the 1994 Asian Junior Championships which was held in Jakarta.

She thereafter joined the Sri Lankan national athletic squad competing in the 1994 Asian Games. She made her South Asian Games debut at the age of 15 during the 1995 edition and claimed gold medals in 100 m and 200 m sprint events. She also got due recognition for her silver medal performances in 100 m events at the Australian Open and Taipei Open in 1995.

She made her maiden Olympic appearance at the age of 20 representing Sri Lanka at the 1996 Summer Olympics and competed in the women's 100 m event. She clinched silver medal in the women's 200 m race at the 1997 World Championships. She also became the first Sri Lankan to win a medal at the World Athletics Championships.

With no support from her national athletics association, she had to go heavily into debt to reach the Olympics. She faced severe financial constraints and mental challenges before her journey to the 2000 Sydney Olympics. She even auctioned and sold out all her trophies in order to raise adequate funds to buy tickets with the intention of training in the USA prior to the Sydney Olympics.

She qualified to take part at the 2000 Summer Olympics after winning the 100 m sprint event at the National Athletics Championships. Notably, she competed in her first track event at the home soil after a gap of 2 years as she was sidelined for several months after sustaining a hamstring injury.

Just a month prior to the scheduled Olympic event, she bettered her own national record in 200 m sprint event twice within just 2 days at the 25th National Sports Festival in August 2000. She also went onto claim gold medals in both 100 m and 200 m events at the 2000 National Sports Festival in her comeback return to the field after successfully recovering from a hamstring injury which ruled her out for several months.

In the women's 200 meters at the 2000 Summer Olympics, she finished behind Marion Jones and Pauline Davis-Thompson to win the bronze medal and became Sri Lanka's first Olympic medalist since 1948. On October 5, 2007, Jones admitted to having taken performance-enhancing drugs prior to the Olympics, and Jayasinghe was later awarded the silver medal.

Jayasinghe was suspended from competition in April 1998 for failing a drug test that she claimed was rigged because of her political beliefs and a falling out with a Sports Ministry official. She was later cleared of the offense. During a press conference for the women's 200 m medalists at the 2000 Olympics, when asked whether her country would be proud of her, she said in a quiet voice:

"I can't explain. You wouldn't understand. They give me, trouble, trouble, trouble. I give them bronze medal. It'll make them sad... It was trouble with me. Doping and sexual harassment."

She alleged during a live segment on Lasantha Wickrematunge's show that the minister S. B. Dissanayake had attempted to sexually harass her. Later, Jayasinghe claimed that she did not specifically accuse Minister Dissanayaka. The television program where Susie made her allegations against S. B. Dissanayake which was aired on TNL TV was suspended after the involvement of powerful politicians.

She then went on to speak of officials coming to her house, giving her a drug test and refusing to seal the urine specimen with her watching. She refused to sign the release. Later they told her she had tested positive for nandrolone. By the time she was cleared, she was no longer welcome by her country's sporting establishment.

After returning home with her Olympic medal she was attacked by a male athlete because, she believed, she had been supporting former government members in an election campaign. It was believed that she reportedly wore a yellow ribbon around her wrist during the 2000 Summer Olympics women's 200 m final and also during the medal ceremony in a show of support for a political movement. The Government of Sri Lanka failed to deliver an hero's welcome when she returned from Sydney with her bronze medal and instead the politicians of the government made scathing attack on her.

However, after her medal achievement she was supported by a national fundraising drive in her homeland. She visited Los Angeles to train with Nagalingam Ethirveerasingam (Asian Games Gold Medalist in the high jump in 1958, and two time Olympian in the high jump, in 1952 and 1956). In May 2001, she also underwent a four-month training stint from American coach Tony Campbell before competing at the 2001 World Athletics Championships.

She was the flag bearer for Sri Lanka during the opening ceremony of the 2004 Summer Olympics. She was slated to be on the entry list for the women's 100 metres but a fracture in her right leg caused her to pull out from the competition. She continued to struggle with injury concerns throughout 2005 and returned to action in 2006. On her comeback return she claimed gold medal in women's 200 m event at the 2006 South Asian Games.

Shortly thereafter, she won gold medals in the 100 m and 200 m at the 2007 Asian Athletics Championships in Jordan and a bronze medal in the 200 m race at the 2007 IAAF World Championships. It was her first World Championship medal in 10 years. On 13 August 2007 she was ranked by the IAAF as 18th in the world for the 100 m sprint and 20th in the world for the 200 m sprint.

She also appeared as the flagbearer for Sri Lanka in both the opening and closing ceremonies of the 2008 Summer Olympics. She became the first and only Sri Lankan athlete to have appeared as a flagbearer in two Olympic events.

On February 5, 2009, Jayasinghe announced her retirement from sports in order to focus on becoming a mother. On March 31, 2009, she gave birth to a baby boy.

In November 2010, she announced her plan to return to competition.

== Honours ==
She was awarded the Most Outstanding Sportswoman of the Year in 2008 by the then Sri Lankan President Mahinda Rajapakse.

She was conferred with the prestigious Deshabandu title during the 2017 Sri Lankan national honours by the then President Maithripala Sirisena.

== Post-sports career ==
Jayasinghe contested the 2010 general election from the Kegalle district from the United People's Freedom Alliance, however failed to secure a seat. In 2016, she was appointed as a paid adviser in the Ministry of Sports for selecting and training prospective track athletes. In June 2017, she attempted to sell her silver medal due to suspension of her Sports Ministry pay. She accused the state and government officials of continuously neglecting her despite her Olympic achievement. She has also been a vocal critic of Sri Lanka Athletics Federation administrators over the years for the lackluster performances by Sri Lanka in athletics.

She accompanied the Sri Lankan Athletics contingent for the 2019 South Asian Games where unexpectedly Sri Lanka eclipsed the medal tally of India in athletics events during the Kathmandu South Asian Games and it also marked the first instance of Sri Lanka with a higher medal achievement than India in athletics at a South Asian Games competition after a gap of 15 years.

== Personal life ==
She married her sports trainer Dhammika Nandakumara on 17 November 2000 at the Ambepussa Rest House. Susanthika was engaged to him in 1994 and the official wedding was arranged for them after a gap of six years following the silver medal achievement for her.

In 2016, she was admitted to the Intensive Care Unit of the Diyatalawa Hospital after being diagnosed with dengue. In 2016, her husband was arrested for assaulting her. She was hospitalised and was discharged soon after. She has one son and one daughter.

On 14 September 2021, she along with her two children were tested positive for COVID-19 after undergoing a PCR test.

== Personal bests ==
Event	Time	Date	Venue
100 m	11.04	September 9, 2000	Yokohama, Japan
200 m	22.28	September 28, 2000	Sydney, Australia

== Achievements ==
Year	Competition	Venue	Position	Event	Notes
1994	Asian Games	Hiroshima, Japan	2nd	200 m	
1995	Asian Championships	Jakarta, Indonesia	2nd	100 m	
1995	Asian Championships	Jakarta, Indonesia	1st	200 m	
1997	World Championships	Athens, Greece	2nd	200 m	
1999	IAAF Grand Prix Final	Munich, Germany	8th	200 m	
2000	Summer Olympics	Sydney, Australia	2nd	200 m	
2001	World Indoor Championships	Lisbon, Portugal	4th	200 m	
2002	Asian Championships	Colombo, Sri Lanka	1st	100 m	
2002	Asian Championships	Colombo, Sri Lanka	1st	200 m	
2002	Commonwealth Games	Manchester, England	4th	100 m	
2002	Asian Games	Busan, South Korea	1st	100 m	
2002	IAAF World Cup	Madrid, Spain	2nd	100 m	
2002	IAAF World Cup	Madrid, Spain	3rd	200 m	
2006	Asian Games	Doha, Qatar	2nd	100 m	
2006	Asian Games	Doha, Qatar	3rd	200 m	
2007	Asian Championships	Amman, Jordan	1st	100 m	
2007	Asian Championships	Amman, Jordan	1st	200 m	
2007	World Championships	Osaka, Japan	3rd	200 m	

== See also ==
- Duncan White
- Sriyantha Dissanayake
- Nagalingam Ethirveerasingam

== Notes ==
Olympic Games
Preceded by Damayanthi Dharsha	Flagbearer for Sri Lanka; Athens 2004; Beijing 2008	Succeeded by Niluka Karunaratne
