= National Olympic Committee of Sri Lanka =

National Olympic Committee

- Country: Sri Lanka
- Code: SRI
- Created: 1937
- Recognized: 1937
- Continental Association: OCA
- Headquarters: Colombo
- President: Mr Suresh Subramaniam
- Secretary General: Mr Maxwell De Silva
- Website: www.olympic.lk

The National Olympic Committee of Sri Lanka (IOC code: SRI) is the National Olympic Committee representing Sri Lanka. It is also the body responsible for Sri Lanka's representation at the Commonwealth Games.

== See also ==
- Sri Lanka at the Olympics
- Sri Lanka at the Commonwealth Games
