= List of South Asian Games records in athletics =

The South Asian Games is a biennial multi-sport event which began in 1984. Athletics has been one of the sports held at the Games since the inaugural edition. Records set by athletes who are representing one of the South Asian Sports Council's member states.

== Men's records ==
Event	Record	Athlete	Nationality	Date	Games	Place	Ref.
100 m	10.26 NWI	Himasha Eashan	Sri Lanka	9 February 2016	2016 Games	Guwahati, India	
100 m	10.28 (−0.2 m/s)	Himasha Eashan	Sri Lanka	9 February 2016	2016 Games	Guwahati, India	
200 m	20.99	Rohan Pradeep Kumara	Sri Lanka	2004	2004 Games	Islamabad, Pakistan	
400 m	45.77	Rohan Pradeep Kumara	Sri Lanka	1999	1999 Games	Kathmandu, Nepal	
800 m	1:47.56	S.A. Ranjit Subasinghe	Sri Lanka	1993	1993 Games	Dhaka, Bangladesh	
1500 m	3:38.00	Bahadur Prasad	India	1995	1995 Games	Madras, India	
5000 m	14:02.04	Man Singh	India	9 February 2016	2016 Games	Guwahati, India	
10,000 m	29:10.53	Gopi T	India	10 February 2016	2016 Games	Guwahati, India	
Marathon	2:15:03	Baikuntha Manandhar	Nepal	1987	1987 Games	Calcutta, India	
110 m hurdles	14.11 NWI	Ghulam Abbas	Pakistan	1989	1989 Games	Islamabad, Pakistan	
400 m hurdles	50.14	Ghulam Abbas	Pakistan	1991	1991 Games	Colombo, Sri Lanka	
3000 m steeplechase	8:42.43	Abdul Muhammad Razzaq	Pakistan	1989	1989 Games	Islamabad, Pakistan	
High jump	2.21 m	Sarvesh Anil Kushare	India	3 December 2019	2019 Games	Kathmandu, Nepal	
Pole vault	4.90 m NR	M.H.I. Sandaruwan	Sri Lanka	10 February 2016	2016 Games	Guwahati, India	
Long jump	7.89 m (±0.0 m/s)	Ankit Sharma	India	10 February 2016	2016 Games	Guwahati, India	
Triple jump	16.45 m NWI	Renjith Maheshwary	India	11 February 2016	2016 Games	Guwahati, India	
Shot put	20.03 m	Tejinder Pal Singh Toor	India	6 December 2019	2019 Games	Kathmandu, Nepal	
Discus throw	57.78 m	Shakti Singh	India	1995	1995 Games	Madras, India	
Hammer throw	66.94 m	Aqarab Abbas	Pakistan	1995	1995 Games	Madras, India	
Javelin throw	86.29 m	Arshad Nadeem	Pakistan	7 December 2019	2019 Games	Kathmandu, Nepal	
4 × 100 m relay	39.14	Himasha Eashan; Chanuka Sandeepa; Vinoj Suranjaya; Yupun Abeykoon	Sri Lanka	6 December 2019	2019 Games	Kathmandu, Nepal	
4 × 400 m relay	3:05.28		Sri Lanka	1999	1999 Games	Kathmandu, Nepal	

Key:
^{WR} World record	^{AR} Asian record	^{NR} National record	^{PB} Athlete's personal best

== Women's records ==
Event	Record	Athlete	Nationality	Date	Games	Place	Ref.
100 m	11.19 NWI	Damayanthi Dharsha	Sri Lanka	1999	1999 Games	Kathmandu, Nepal	
200 m	22.68 NWI	Damayanthi Dharsha	Sri Lanka	1999	1999 Games	Kathmandu, Nepal	
400 m	52.11	Damayanthi Dharsha	Sri Lanka	1999	1999 Games	Kathmandu, Nepal	
800 m	1:59.85	Shiny Wilson	India	1995	1995 Games	Madras, India	
1500 m	4:14.23	Sunita Rani	India	1999	1999 Games	Kathmandu, Nepal	
5000 m	15:45.75	L Surya	India	9 February 2016	2016 Games	Guwahati, India	
10,000 m	32:39.86	L Surya	India	11 February 2016	2016 Games	Guwahati, India	
Marathon	2:38:10	Vally Satyabhama	India	1995	1995 Games	Madras, India	
100 m hurdles	13.12 NWI	Sriyani Kulawansa	Sri Lanka	1999	1999 Games	Kathmandu, Nepal	
High jump	1.81 m	Sangeetha Mohan	India	2004	2004 Games	Islamabad, Pakistan	
High jump	1.81 m	Priyangika Madumanthi	Sri Lanka	2010	2010 Games	Dhaka, Bangladesh	
Long jump	6.43 m (+0.5 m/s)	Mayookha Johnny	India	9 February 2016	2016 Games	Guwahati, India	
Triple jump	13.85 m (±0.0 m/s)	Mayookha Johnny	India	10 February 2016	2016 Games	Guwahati, India	
Shot put	17.94 m	Manpreeth Kaur	India	9 February 2016	2016 Games	Guwahati, India	
Discus throw	57.03 m	Seema Antil	India	2004	2004 Games	Islamabad, Pakistan	
Javelin throw	59.45 m	Suman Devi	India	11 February 2016	2016 Games	Guwahati, India	
4 × 100 m relay	44.63		Sri Lanka	2006		Colombo, Sri Lanka	
4 × 400 m relay	3:32.35		India	1999	1999 Games	Kathmandu, Nepal	
