= Athletics at the 2004 South Asian Games =

Athletics at the 9th South Asian Games
- Dates: 2 April – 6 April
- Host city: Islamabad, Pakistan
- Venue: Jinnah Stadium
- Level: Senior
- Events: 32
- Participation: ? athletes from 8 nations
- Records set: 6 Games records

At the 2004 South Asian Games, the athletics events were held at the Jinnah Stadium in Islamabad, Pakistan from 2 to 6 April 2004. A total of 32 events were contested, 19 by male and 13 by female athletes. Six Games records were set over the course of the five-day competition.

India topped the medal rankings with 15 golds and 29 medals. Sri Lanka were second best, followed by the hosts Pakistan. Madhuri Singh scored an 800/1500 metres double gold medal in the women's events. Sri Lanka's Rohan Pradeep Kumara made an impact on the men's side by winning the 200 and 400 metres events, as well as helping the Sri Lanka 4×400 m relay team to another gold.

== Records ==
Name	Event	Country	Record	Type
Manjula Kumara Wijesekara	High jump	Sri Lanka	2.20 m	GR NR
Rohan Pradeep Kumara	200 metres	Sri Lanka	20.99	GR
K. Nagraj; Sandeep Sukeria; M. Vilesh; Piyush Kumar	4×100 metres relay	India	39.91	GR
Anaejeet Singh	Triple jump	India	16.16 m	GR
Sangeetha Mohan	High jump	India	1.81 m	GR
Seema Antil	Discus throw	India	57.03 m	GR

Key:	WR — World record • AR — Area record • GR — Games record • NR — National record

== Medal summary ==
=== Men ===
Event	Gold		Silver		Bronze	
100 metres	Piyush Kumar (IND)	10.44	Vilas Nelgunda (IND)	10.62	Muhammad Shahbaz (PAK)	10.67
200 metres	Rohan Pradeep Kumara (SRI)	20.99 GR	Muhammad Imran (PAK)	21.24	Piyush Kumar (IND)	21.35
400 metres	Rohan Pradeep Kumara (SRI)	45.89	Prasanna Sampath Amarasekara (SRI)	45.95	Saghir Ahmad (PAK)	46.75 NR
800 metres	Mohammed Sifrath (SRI)	1:51.60	Gramanda Ran (IND)	1:52.21	Irshad Fazal (PAK)	1:52.24
1500 metres	Atta Miran (PAK)	3:43.40	Chaminda Wijekoon (SRI)	3:44.85	Ghamanda Ram (IND)	3:50.18
5000 metres	Naushad Khan (PAK)	14:39.47	Rajindra Baledran (IND)	14:42.63	Kathan Chandradasa (SRI)	14:42.68
110 metre hurdles	Abdul Rashid (PAK)	14.33	Muhammed Shah (PAK)	14.41	Krishan Mohan (IND)	14.42
400 metre hurdles	Allad Ditta (PAK)	51.15	A.M.P Suranga Adikari (SRI)	51.3	Mumammed Adil (PAK)	52.15
3000 metre steeplechase	Upendra Bandara (SRI)	8:57.04	Rajendra Bahadur Bhandari (NEP)	8:57.30 NR	Safdar Nazmir (PAK)	9:10.53
4×100 metres relay	India (IND); K. Nagraj; Sandeep Sukeria; M. Vilesh; Piyush Kumar	39.91 GR	Sri Lanka (SRI); DMPP Caldera; RDUS Surendra; ARMCB Ramanayake; Joy Danushka Perera	40.09	Pakistan (PAK); Nasim Shah; Mohammad Shahbaz; Afzal Baig; Mohammad Imran	40.36 NR
4×400 metres relay	Sri Lanka (SRI); Rohan Pradeep Kumara; Ranga Wimalawansa; Prasanna Sampath Amarasekara; Sugath Thilakaratne	3:05.80	Pakistan (PAK); Saeed Ahmad; Basit Munir; Abdul Majid; Rana Saghir Ahmad	3:07.03	India (IND); PS Sreejith; K Suresh; Anil Kumar Rohil; P Shankar	3:07.13
Marathon	Anuradha Indrajith Cooray (SRI)	2:16:38	Ajit Bandara (SRI)	2:19.29	Arjun Bahadur (NEP)	2: 21.23
High jump	Manjula Kumara Wijesekara (SRI)	2.20 m GR NR	Nalin Priyadharshana (SRI)	2.11 m	Omveer Singh (IND)	2.09 m
Long jump	Mohan Singh (IND)	7.70 m	Ghulam Abbas (PAK)	7.60 m	Amril Pal (IND)	7.59 m
Triple jump	Anaejeet Singh (IND)	16.16 m GR	Zafar Iqbad (PAK)	15.79 m	K.C. Saintison (IND)	15.69 m
Shot put	Ranvijay Singh (IND)	17.41 m	Kulvender Singh (IND)	16.71 m	Ashraf Ali (PAK)	16.41 m
Discus throw	Hirdayand Singh (IND)	53.77 m	Sukhbir Singh (IND)	53.55 m	Azhar Saleem (PAK)	51.35 m
Hammer throw	Nadeen Ahamed (PAK)	62.88 m	Habib Ullah (PAK)	62.85 m	Nirbhay Singh (IND)	62.77 m
Javelin throw	K. Lijesh (IND)	75.71 m	Zahid Hussain (PAK)	74.67 m	Irfan Muhammed (PAK)	71.10 m

=== Women ===
Event	Gold		Silver		Bronze	
100 metres	Jani Chathurangani Silva (SRI)	11.81	K.M. Greeshma (IND)	11.96	Poonam Tomer (IND)	11.98
200 metres	Susanthika Jayasinghe (SRI)	23.49	Buddika Sujani (SRI)	24.31	Poonam Toner (IND)	24.76
400 metres	S. Geetha (IND)	52.25	Chitra Soman (IND)	52.43	Neuman Nehar (BAN)	55.46
800 metres	Madhuri Singh (IND)	2:07.61	Mangal Priyadharshani (SRI)	2:07.84	Gulanaz Ara (PAK)	2:09.49.
1500 metres	Madhuri Singh (IND)	4:31.16	Sumeera Zaheer (PAK)	4:31.41 NR	Preeja Sreedharan (IND)	4:32.24
100 metre hurdles	Sriyani Kulawansa (SRI)	13.37	Priya Natrajan (IND)	13.84	Soma Biswa (IND)	13.88
4×100 metres relay	Sri Lanka (SRI); Jani Chathurangani Silva; Sriyani Kulawansa; Achala Dias; Sujani Buddhika	46.13	India (IND)	46.21	Bangladesh (BAN)	47.92
4×400 metres relay	India (IND)	3:33.49	Sri Lanka (SRI)	3:44.12	Pakistan (PAK)	3:46.10
High jump	Sangeetha Mohan (IND)	1.81 m GR	Sahana Kumari (IND)	1.75 m	Priyangika Maduwanthi (SRI)	1.69 m
Long jump	Jetty Joseph (IND)	6.30 m	Foujia Huda (BAN)	6.07 m	Pooja Ahlawat (IND)	5.82 m
Shot put	Latha Nicholas (IND)	15.36 m	A. Chaitali (IND)	14.48 m	Zeenath Praveen (PAK)	13.47 m
Discus throw	Seema Antil (IND)	57.03 m GR	Krish Na (IND)	49.13 m	Padma Wijesundara (SRI)	42.31 m
Javelin throw	Anne Maheshi De Silva (SRI)	51.37 m	Gurmeet Kaur (IND)	51.27 m	Suman Devi (IND)	50.58 m

== Medal table ==
* Host nation (Pakistan)

Rank	Nation	Gold	Silver	Bronze	Total
1	India (IND)	15	12	14	41
2	Sri Lanka (SRI)	12	9	3	24
3	Pakistan (PAK)*	5	8	12	25
4	Nepal (NEP)	0	2	1	3
5	Bangladesh (BAN)	0	1	2	3
6	Afghanistan (AFG)	0	0	0	0
6	Bhutan (BHU)	0	0	0	0
6	Maldives (MDV)	0	0	0	0
Totals (8 entries)		32	32	32	96
