= Athletics at the 2016 South Asian Games =

Athletics at the 12th South Asian Games
- Dates: 9 – 12 February
- Host city: Guwahati, India
- Venue: Indira Gandhi Athletic Stadium
- Level: Senior
- Events: 37
- Participation: 8 nations
- Records set: ?

Athletics at the 2016 South Asian Games were held in Guwahati, India from 9 to 12 February 2016.

== Medalists ==
=== Men ===
Event	Gold		Silver		Bronze	
100 metres	Himasha Eashan; Sri Lanka	10.28 GR	Saaid Hassan; Maldives	10.41	Mohommed Ashraful; Sri Lanka	10.69
200 metres	M.V. Suranjaya De Silva; Sri Lanka	21.00	Saaid Hassan; Maldives	21.15	Liaquat Ali; Pakistan	21.53
400 metres	Arokia Rajiv; India	46.23	Kunhu Muhammed; India	46.73	Dilip Ruwan; Sri Lanka	47.30
800 metres	Indunil Herath; Sri Lanka	1:51.46	Muhammad Ikram; Pakistan	1:51.86	Ajay Kumar Saroj; India	1:52.04
1500 metres	Ajay Kumar Saroj; India	3:53.46	Sanjeewa Lakmal; Sri Lanka	3:54.16	Rahul Kumar Pal; India	3:55.07
5000 metres	Man Singh; India	14:02.04 GR	Suresh Kumar; India	14:02.70	Hari Kumar Rimal; Nepal	14:32.18
10,000 metres	Gopi T India	29:10.53 GR	Suresh Kumar; India	29:20.49	Lionel Samarajeewa; Sri Lanka	30:22.54
110 metres hurdles	Jayakumar Surendhar; India	14.13	Prem Kumar K India	14.18	Mohsin Ali; Pakistan	14.26
400 metres hurdles	Ayyasamy Dharun; India	50.54	Jithin Paul; India	50.57	Mehboob Ali; Pakistan	52.04
4×100 metres relay	Sri Lanka (SRI)	39.96	Umar Khayam Hameed; Pakistan	40.56 m	India (IND)	41.09
4×400 metres relay	India (IND)	3:06.74	Sri Lanka (SRI)	3:07.59	Pakistan (PAK)	3:14.82
Marathon	Nitendra Singh Rawat; India	2:15:18	Anuradha Cooray; Sri Lanka	2:15:19	Khetha Ram; India	2:21:14
High jump	Manjula Kumara; Sri Lanka	2.17 m	Tejaswin Shankar; India	2.17 m	Ajay Kumar; India	2.08 m
Pole vault	Ishara Sandaruwan; Sri Lanka	4.90 GR	Sonu Saini; India	4.80	Rehan Anjum; Pakistan	4.60 m
Long jump	Ankit Sharma; India	7.89 m GR	K Prem Kumar; India	7.62 m	Amila Jayasiri; Sri Lanka	7.46 m
Triple jump	Renjith Maheshwary; India	16.45 m GR	J. Surendhar; India	15.89 m	Muhammad Afzal; Pakistan	15.76 m
Shot put	Om Prakash Karhana; India	18.45 m	Jasdeep Singh; India	17.56 m	Muhammad Waseem; Pakistan	16.28 m
Discus throw	Arjun; India	57.21 m	Kirpal Singh Batth; India	56.59 m	U.P. Jayawardana; Sri Lanka	53.52 m
Hammer throw	Neeraj Kumar; India	66.14 m	Shakeel Ahmed; Pakistan	63.67 m	Alansan; Sri Lanka	46.38 m
Javelin throw	Neeraj Chopra; India	82.23 m GR	Sumeda Ranasinghe; Sri Lanka	80.25 m	Arshad Nadeem; Pakistan	78.33 m

=== Women ===
Event	Gold		Silver		Bronze	
100 metres	Rumeshika Rathnayake; Sri Lanka	11.71	Srabani Nanda; India	11.72	Dutee Chand; India	11.75
200 metres	Srabani Nanda; India	23.91	Dutee Chand; India	24.14	Rumeshika Rathnayake; Sri Lanka	24.17
400 metres	M. R. Poovamma; India	54.10	Chandrika Rasnayake; Sri Lanka	54.40	Omaya Udayangani; Sri Lanka	54.70
800 metres	Nimali Liyanarachchi; Sri Lanka	2:09.40	Gayanthika Abeyrathne; Sri Lanka	2:09.64	Mrimuth Gomathy; India	2:10.99
1500 metres	PU Chitra; India	4:25.59	Gayanthika Abeyrathne; Sri Lanka	4:25.75	Nilani Rathnayake; Sri Lanka	4:26.70
5000 metres	L. Suriya; India	15:45.75 GR	Swati Haridas Gadhave; India	16:14.57	Nilani Rathnayake; Sri Lanka	17:00.85
10,000 metres	L. Suriya; India	32:39.86 GR	Swati Haridas Gadhave; India	33:57.09	S. A. Lama Hewage; Sri Lanka	36:11.39
100 metres hurdles	Gayathri Govindaraj; India	13.83	Sajitha KV; India	14.26	Ireshani Rajasinghe; Sri Lanka	14.37
400 metres hurdles	Jauna Murmu; India	57.69	Ashwini Akkunji; India	58.92	Kawshalya Madushani; Sri Lanka	59.87
4×100 metres relay	Sri Lanka (SRI)	45.50	India (IND)	45.79	Bangladesh (BAN)	47.44
4×400 metres relay	India (IND)	3:35.44	Sri Lanka (SRI)	3:38.89	Bangladesh (BAN)	3:53.27
Marathon	Kavita Raut; India	2:38:38.00	Niluka Geethani Rajasekara; Sri Lanka	2:50:47.00	B. G. L. Anuradhi; Sri Lanka	2:52:15.00
High jump	Sahana Kumari; India	1.78 m	Tharanga Vinodani; Sri Lanka; Swapna Barman; India	1.75 m	None awarded	
Long jump	Mayookha Johny; India	6.43 m GR	Shradha Bhaskar; India	6.19 m	Sarangi Silva; Sri Lanka	5.89 m
Triple jump	Mayookha Johny; India	13.85 m GR	Vidusha Lakshani; Sri Lanka	13.18 m	Prajusha M A India	12.95 m
Shot put	Manpreet Kaur Sr. India	17.94 m GR	Manpreet Kaur Jr. India	15.94 m	Tharika Fernando; Sri Lanka	14.87 m
Javelin throw	Suman Devi; India	59.45 m GR	Annu Rani; India	57.13 m	Nadeeka Lakmali; Sri Lanka	54.82 m

== Medal table ==
Rank	Nation	Gold	Silver	Bronze	Total
1	India (IND)	28	22	8	58
2	Sri Lanka (SRI)	9	11	17	37
3	Pakistan (PAK)	0	3	8	11
4	Maldives (MDV)	0	2	0	2
5	Bangladesh (BAN)	0	0	2	2
6	Nepal (NEP)	0	0	1	1
Totals (6 entries)		37	38	36	111
