= Yupun Abeykoon =

Sri Lankan track and field athlete

Personal information
- Full name: Abeykoon Mudiyansalage Yupun Priyadarshana
- Born: 31 December 1994 (age 31) Negombo, Western Province, Sri Lanka
- Height: 6 ft 1 in (185 cm)

Sport
- Events: 100m, 200m
- Coached by: Claudio Licciardello

Achievements and titles
- Personal bests: 100 m: 9.96s (Switzerland, 2022, NR); 200 m: 20.37s (Italy, 2022, NR)
Medal record
Men's Athletics
Representing Sri Lanka
Commonwealth Games
Bronze medal – third place	2022 Birmingham	100 m
South Asian Games
Gold medal – first place	2019 Kathmandu	4 × 100 m relay
Military World Games
Bronze medal – third place	2015 Mungyeong	4 × 100 m relay

Abeykoon Mudiyansalage Yupun Priyadarshana, known as Yupun Abeykoon (Sinhala: යුපුන් අබේකෝන්), also referred to as Yupun Priyadarshana (born 31 December 1994), is a retired Sri Lankan track and field athlete who specialized as a Sprinter. He is the Sri Lankan national record holder in men's 100m, men's 200m and in men's indoor 60m. On 3 July 2022, he became the first South Asian to break the 10-Second barrier for the men's 100 meters event at the Resisprint International competition, with a timing of 9.96 seconds, in La Chaux-de-Fonds, Switzerland. He currently resides in Italy as he went on a scholarship to Italy in 2015. He is also attached to the Electronic and Mechanical Engineering Regiment of the Sri Lanka Army and represents Army Sports Club. He is currently regarded as the fastest Sri Lankan man as well as fastest South Asian man in men's 100m and 200m disciplines.

Abeykoon is also the first and only Sri Lankan to have competed at the Diamond League. In April 2022, he set the new Asian record in the men's 150m by clocking 15.16 seconds. On 22 May 2022 at a meeting held at the Stadio Zecchini, Grosseto in Italy he won the men's 200 meters event setting a new national record of 20.37 seconds. On 25 May 2022 at an event held at the Paul-Greifzu-Stadion, Dessau in Germany he won the men's 100 meters setting a new national record of 10.06 seconds.

He announced his retirement from the sport on 21 July 2026.

== Biography ==
Abeykoon was born in Negombo, Western Province near Pannala. He pursued his primary education at the Pannala National School, where he also pursued his interest in track and field events. He began his interest in athletics after being inspired from veteran Olympic medalist Susanthika Jayasinghe. Abeykoon began pursuing his athletics career in 2004 when his teachers picked him at a school meet. He later switched to the St. Joseph Vaz College, Wennepuwa at the age of 16 with the recommendation of his personal coach.

Abeykoon also follows MotoGP. Prior to his living in Italy, his father had worked in a holiday villa in Italy for some time.

== Career ==
Abeykoon represented Sri Lanka at the 2013 South Asian Junior Athletics Championships which was held in Ranchi and finished fourth in the men's triple jump competition. He later switched from triple jump to sprint events due to the influence of his coaches. Abeykoon competed at the 2015 Military World Games representing Sri Lanka and took bronze medal in men's 4 × 100 m relay event. He underwent training at Fiammegialle Sports Centre in Italy when he was on his scholarship in Italy. Abeykoon began training with former Italian 400m runner and Olympian Claudio Licciardello during his stay in Italy.

Abeykoon also represented Sri Lanka at the 2019 South Asian Games and claimed gold medal in the men's 4 × 100 m relay event. He was also part of the team consisting of Chanuka Sandeepa, Himasha Eashan and Vinoj Suranjaya which set new national and South Asian Games record in men's 4 × 100 m relay event during the 2019 South Asian Games.

On 8 September 2020, Abeykoon shattered the South Asian record as well as national record held by Himasha Eashan in men's 100m event with a timing of 10.16 seconds after winning an athletic competition which was held in Dessau, Germany. He surpassed the previous best of 10.22 held by compatriot Himasha Eashan. Abeykoon earned the nickname "South Asia's fastest man" after breaking the South Asian record in the men's 100m event. On 26 September 2020, Abeykoon claimed a bronze medal in the men's 100m event with a timing of 10.24 seconds at the Gala dei Castelli as a part of the World Athletics Bronze Level Series Meet which was held in Switzerland. His bronze medal achievement during the 2020 Gala dei Castelli made him the first Sri Lankan sprinter after the 1990s to be placed among the top three in a running event when running alongside top European and African sprinters.

In January 2021, Abeykoon renewed his own personal and national Sri Lanka 60m indoor record with a timing of 6.59 seconds at the Italian indoor championship. He surpassed his own national indoor record of 6.78 seconds which he achieved in 2017. On 13 May 2021, he renewed his own personal as well as the national record for men's 100m event by clocking at 10.15 seconds which he set during the Meeting di Savona Championship in Italy. In the same month, he bettered his own personal record in the men's 100m event by clocking at 10.09 seconds which he achieved in the 100m final at the Anhalt 2021 competition which was held in Dessau, Germany. In June 2021, he skipped the World Athletic Continental Madrid Meet in Spain despite it being one of the Olympic qualifying competitions.

As of June 2021, Abeykoon reached his career-best world ranking of 48 following a fourth-place finish in the men's 100 event at the Golden Gala as part of the 2021 Diamond League Meet at Florence (Florence Diamond League). He also became the first Sri Lankan to compete at the Diamond League. He was ranked in 65th position in the Road to Olympic Rankings prior to competing at the Rome Diamond League. In the same month Abeykoon also qualified to represent Sri Lanka at the 2020 Summer Olympics, which was also his maiden Olympic appearance, and competed in the men's 100m event. He was also the first and only Sri Lankan to achieve direct qualification standards for the 2020 Summer Olympics. Abeykoon also became the first Sri Lankan to obtain direct qualification for the 100m event at the Olympics, 25 years after Chintaka de Zoysa's direct qualification at the 1996 Summer Olympics. Abeykoon also became the first South Asian sprinter in 32 years to qualify for the men's 100m event at the Olympics. He was also the only Sri Lankan male track and field athlete to compete at the Tokyo Olympics. On 31 July 2021, he completed his 100m race with a timing of 10.32 seconds in the Tokyo Olympics and was ranked sixth in the heat event and thus failed to qualify for the next round. In August 2021, he was named as Sri Lanka's flagbearer by the National Olympic Committee of Sri Lanka for the closing ceremony of the 2020 Summer Olympics.

In September 2021, Abeykoon competed in the Weltklasse Zürich which was part of the 2021 Diamond League, and was placed at ninth position with a timing of 10.25 seconds in the men's 100m final. This was also his second Diamond League meet appearance after previously competing at the Golden Gala meet.

On 24 April 2022, Abeykoon broke the Asian record in the men's 150m event with a timing of 15.16 seconds to claim gold medal in the Perseo Trophy which was held at the Stadio Raul Guidobaldi in Rieti, Italy. The previous Asian record for men's 150m event was held by Japan's Yoshihide Kiryu who clocked 15.35 seconds in 2017.

On 26 April 2022, the Athletics Association of Sri Lanka named Abeykoon in the team of eight athletes for the 2022 Commonwealth Games and it also marks his maiden Commonwealth Games appearance. On 22 May 2022, he competed in the 12th Castiglione International Meeting which was held at the Stadio Zecchini in Grosseto, Italy; he won the men's 200 meters event setting a new national record of 20.37 seconds, and broke the previous national record held by Vinoj Suranjaya who achieved it in 20.52 seconds in 2018. On 25 May 2022, he competed in the Anhalt 2022 International Meet which was held at the Paul-Greifzu-Stadion in Dessau, Germany; he won the men's 100 meters setting a new national record of 10.06 seconds. In June 2022, he took part in BAUHAUS-galan as part of the 2022 Diamond League, and missed the bronze medal by a whisker of 0.02 seconds in the men's 100m event.

On 3 July 2022, Abeykoon became the first Sri Lankan, first South Asian sprinter, as well as the fourth Asian overall in history ever to break the 10-second barrier when he won the Résisprint International 2022 title (which was a World Athletics Continental Tour Challenger meeting) in Switzerland. His achievement also meant Sri Lanka became the 32nd country in the world to have a sub-10 second sprinter; he also became the 167th member of the sub-10 club. After becoming the first South Asian to break the 10-second barrier, Abeykoon revealed that he was inspired by Indian javelin thrower Neeraj Chopra's heroic gold medal performance at the 2020 Summer Olympics and insisted that he would follow Chopra's footstep to inspire young kids in the field of athletics.

On 15 July 2022, Abeykoon qualified to represent Sri Lanka at the 2022 World Athletics Championships in the men's 100m competition, and was also the only male athlete to represent Sri Lanka at the 2022 World Athletics Championships. It also marked his maiden appearance at the World Athletics Championships. He entered the event as the fifteenth-fastest athlete globally for the year, and as the fastest Asian. He was ranked 37th out of 56 athletes who had qualified in the world rankings (Road to World Championship List) for the 2022 World Athletics Championships, but he managed to obtain direct qualification for the competition on the back of his record-breaking performance at the Resisprint International in Switzerland. Abeykoon also became the first Sri Lankan sprinter in 13 years after Shehan Ambepitiya to compete in the men's 100m at a World Athletics Championship. He placed fifth in the heats round in the men's 100m event with a timing of 10.19 seconds, thus failing to qualify for the semi-final. His participation along with Gayanthika Abeyratne and Nilani Ratnayake for the 2022 World Athletic Championship was clouded with uncertainties owing to delays in obtaining US visas in order to participate at the competition.

On 3 August 2022, Abeykoon won the bronze medal in the men's 100m final at the Birmingham Commonwealth Games after finishing the race in 10.14 seconds. He also became the first Sri Lankan to win a Commonwealth Games medal in athletics since Sriyani Kulawansa and Sugath Thilakaratne's medal feats at the 1998 Commonwealth Games. He also became the first Sri Lankan to win a Commonwealth Games medal in either the men's or women's 100m events. During the heat event of the 2022 Commonwealth Games men's 100m category, he managed to set an all-time fastest-ever timing in Commonwealth Games history for the event after finishing with a timing of 10.06 seconds. The previous record in the 100m men's heats was held by Canada's Glenroy Gilbert, who had finished the heat with a timing of 10.10 seconds during the 1994 Commonwealth Games. Abeykoon's timing of 10.06 seconds in Heat 6 of the men's 100m event eventually earned him a spot in the semi-finals of the competition. He finished with a timing of 10.20 seconds in the men's 100m semi-final, which helped him secure a berth in the men's 100m final, the only Asian athlete to qualify for the final. He also became the first Sri Lankan to reach the final of the 100m event in Commonwealth Games history.

In 2024 May, Yupun won at the Anhalt Athletic Championship held at Germany, recording 10.16s with wind at +0.3. This was for the Men's 100m sprint.

== In media ==
A leading prominent Sri Lankan English-language newspaper edition, the Sunday Observer, was heavily criticised by several Sri Lankan politicians, including Sri Lankan sports minister Namal Rajapaksa, for insulting Abeykoon with the headline "Pathetic Yupun cuts a sorry figure," referring to his 6th-place finish in the men's 100m heat event at the 2020 Summer Olympics.
