= Sarangi Silva =

Sri Lankan track and field athlete

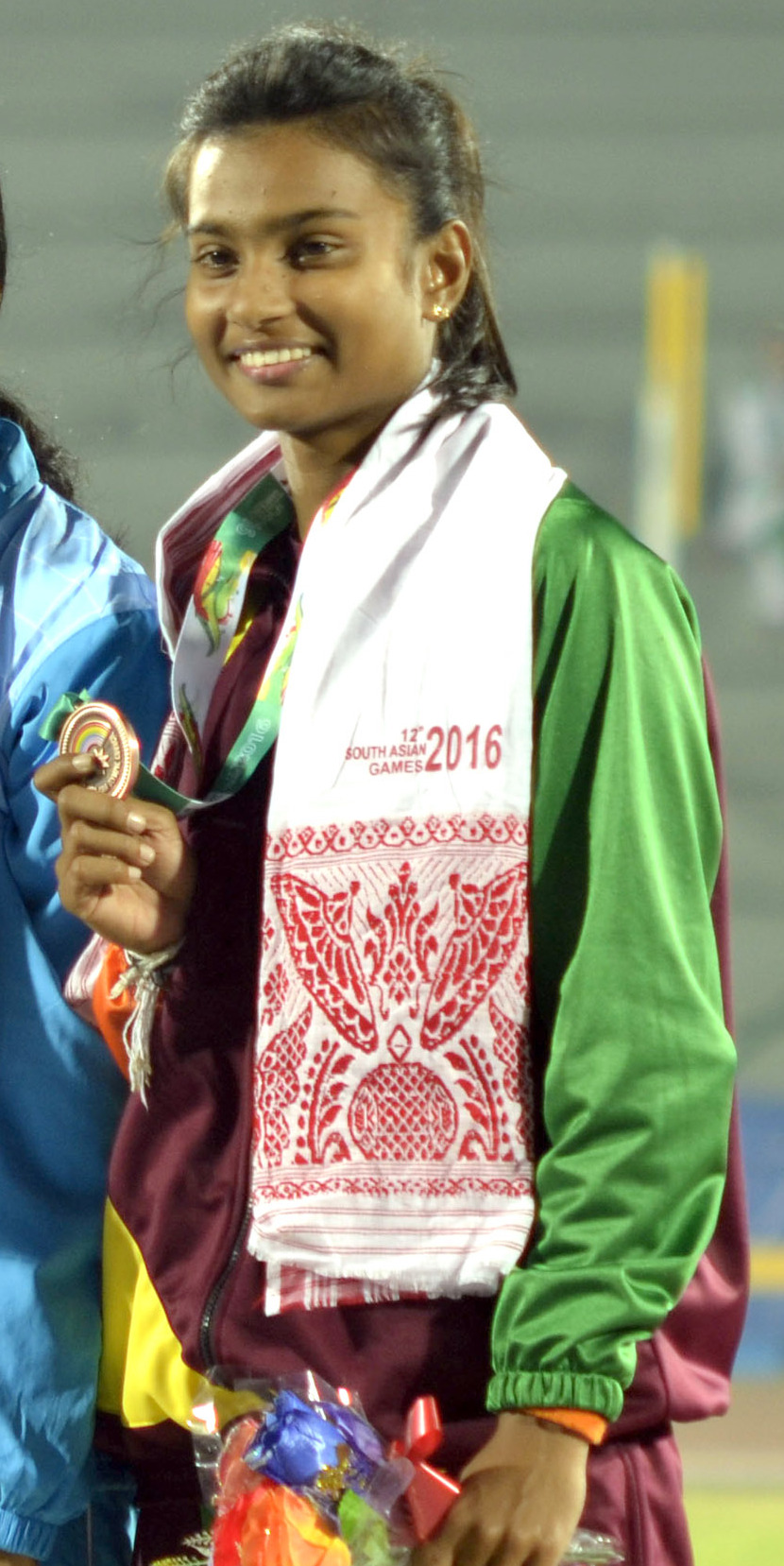
- Sarangi Silva poses with her bronze medal during the 2016 South Asian Games

Personal information
- Native name: සාරංගි සිල්වා
- Full name: Lakshini Sarangi Silva Sandaradura
- Nationality: Sri Lankan
- Born: Lakshini Sarangi Silva; 27 October 1996 (age 29)
- Education: Sri Sumangala Girls' School- Panadura; ICBT Campus
- Occupations: track and field athlete, banker, Army volunteer
- Years active: 2012 – present
- Employer: Seylan Bank

Sport
- Sport: Athletics (Track and field)
- Events: long jump, 4 × 100 metres relay
- Club: Sri Lanka Army
Medal record
Women's Athletics
Representing Sri Lanka
South Asian Games
Gold medal – first place	2019 Kathmandu	Long jump
Gold medal – first place	2019 Kathmandu	4 × 100 m relay
Gold medal – first place	2016 Guwahati	Long jump

Lakshini Sarangi Silva Sandaradura (Sinhala: සාරංගි සිල්වා; born 27 October 1996), also known as Sarangi de Silva, is a Sri Lankan track and field athlete who has specialized in long jump. She also works as a banker at Seylan Bank. She is the current national title holder in women's long jump in Sri Lanka and is also a current national record holder in the women's long jump with a career best leap of 6.65 meters.

== Biography ==
She pursued her primary and secondary education at the Sri Sumangala College in Panadura. Her father served as an army officer and her brother works as a quantity surveyor. She began her pursuit of sports activities at a very young age, when she was in school. She joined Sri Lanka Army as a volunteer after completing her Advanced Level Education. She pursued her Higher National Diploma studies in Business Management at the ICBT Campus.

== Career ==
She took part at the 2012 Asian Junior Athletics Meet when she was 16 years old and secured fifth position in long jump. She endured a tough phase in 2014 due to an injury setback, but she raced against time to recover from the injury concerns and participated at the Asian Junior Championship, which was held in the same year in Chinese Taipei. In 2014, she was adjudged the top performer in the girls under-20 category in the long jump event during the 84th edition of the John Tarbat Senior Athletic Championships. She briefly stopped taking part at sport-related activities in 2015 due to GCE Advanced Level Examination. After a brief hiatus, she then competed in the 2016 South Asian Games, which was also her maiden appearance at the South Asian Games. She clinched a bronze medal in the women's long jump event representing Sri Lanka at the 2016 South Asian Games, and it was also her first South Asian Games medal.

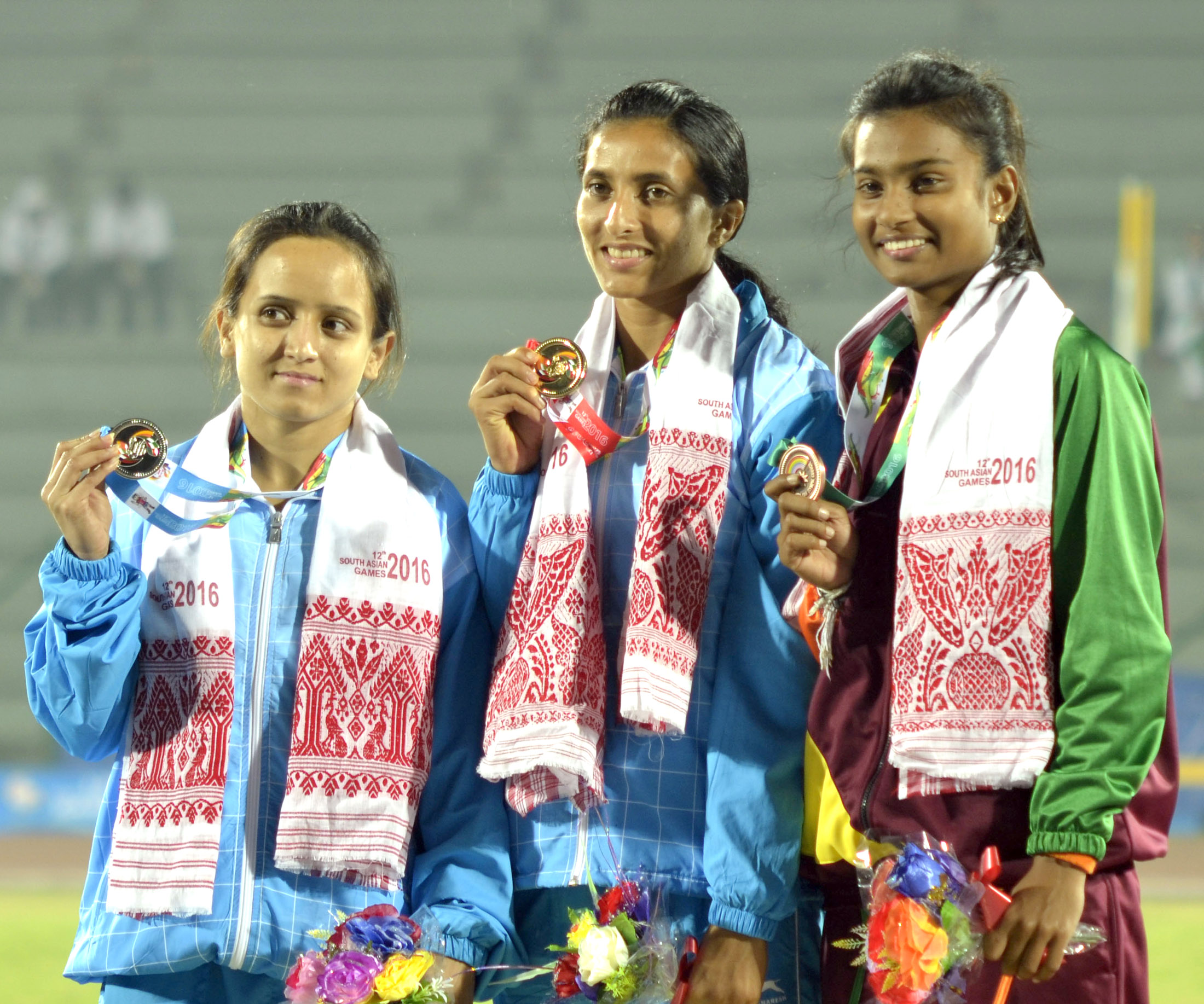
Sarangi Silva (on the right), standing on the podium, posing for a picture alongside Indian athletes Mayookha Johny and Shardha Ghule during the 2016 South Asian Games

She claimed gold medals in both the women's 100m event and women's long jump event at the 2017 Brunei Open Athletics Meet. She also claimed a bronze medal in the women's long jump at the 2019 Thailand Open Track and Field Championship. She represented Sri Lanka at the 2019 South Asian Games, which also marked her second appearance at the South Asian Games, and clinched a gold medal in the women's long jump event with a leap clearing a distance of 6.38 meters in the final round. She also claimed another gold medal at the 2019 South Asian Games in the women's 4 × 100 m relay event. She also represented Sri Lanka at the 2019 Military World Games and claimed fourth position in the women's long jump event. She was included as one of the members of the Sri Lankan contingent for the 2020 Asian Indoor Athletics Championships, but the tournament was cancelled due to the threat of the COVID-19 pandemic. In June 2021, she surpassed the long-standing national record held by N. C. D. Priyadharshani in the women's long jump during the International Athletics Championships in Turkey by clearing a distance of 6.44 meters. In 2021, she received a special sports scholarship offer from the National Olympic Committee of Sri Lanka to gain training in Qatar.

She clinched a gold medal in the Athletic Ageneve Meeting 2022 which was held in Geneva, Switzerland. In February 2022, she participated at the National Athletic Trials and broke her own national record in long jump. She cleared 6.53 meters in her first attempt at the 2022 National Athletic Trials and she bettered it further in following attempt by establishing the new Sri Lankan national record in women's long jump by leaping 6.65 meters. She was short-listed by Sri Lanka Athletics as one of the track and field athletes to represent Sri Lanka at the 2022 Commonwealth Games as well as to represent Sri Lanka at the 2022 Asian Games. She was eligible for selection based on her performances at the 100th National Athletic Championships which was held in April 2022 where she claimed the national title in the women's long jump event. The 100th National Athletic Championships served as the final trials to select the Sri Lankan contingent for both the 2022 Commonwealth Games and 2022 Asian Games.

She received an opportunity to represent Sri Lanka at the 2022 World Athletics Championships in the women's long jump event following the withdrawals of track and field athletes who were supposed to compete at the 2022 World Athletics Championships. World Athletics gave green light to Sarangi Silva's eligibility for participation at the World Athletics Championships by informing Sri Lanka Athletics regarding the withdrawal of two athletes who were ranked among the top 32 in the world rankings. However, Sarangi herself decided to withdraw from the 2022 World Athletics Championships in order to focus and concentrate on her preparations for the 2022 Commonwealth Games. It was also revealed that Sarangi had already made arrangements to obtain training sessions in Turkey and Poland, specifically targeting the Commonwealth Games, and it was also revealed that the decision to send Sarangi to the 2022 World Athletics Championships would not have been possible in the first place owing to the late announcement by World Athletics. She competed in the women's long jump event at the 2022 Commonwealth Games and qualified for the final round after an impressive finish in the qualification round, where she leaped 6.42 meters. She eventually secured the last position in the women's long jump final among 13 runners by leaping 6.07 meters. Sarangi Silva also set a record by becoming the first Sri Lankan long jumper, either male or female, to qualify for the final round of the Commonwealth Games.

In May 2023, she toured Japan and competed in the Seiko Golden Grand Prix as part of her self preparations ahead of the 2022 Asian Games. She was named in Sri Lankan contingent for the 2023 Asian Athletics Championships and she competed in the women's long jump event. She competed in the women's long jump event at the 2022 Asian Games and finished at sixth place in the final.
