= Najma Parveen =

Pakistani sprinter (born 1990)

Personal information
- Born: 20 December 1990 (age 35) Pakistan
- Height: 5 ft 5 in (1.65 m)
- Weight: 56 kg (123 lb)

Sport
- Country: Pakistan
- Sport: Athletics
- Event: Sprint
Medal record
Women's athletics
Representing Pakistan
South Asian Games
Gold medal – first place	2019 Kathmandu	400 m hurdles
Silver medal – second place	2019 Kathmandu	200 m
Silver medal – second place	2019 Kathmandu	4×400 m relay
Bronze medal – third place	2019 Kathmandu	4×100 m relay

Najma Parveen (born 20 December 1990) is a Pakistani sprinter. She represented Pakistan at the 2016 and 2020 Summer Olympics, becoming the first female athlete to represent the country in two Olympics. She is the current national record holder in 200m, 400m and 400m hurdles.

== Career ==
Parveen is part of the country's elite pool of athletes.

=== National ===
Parveen represents WAPDA in all national competitions. She broke the 200m record at the 33rd National Games in Peshawar in 2019. A month later she would break it again in Nepal.

=== International ===
She competed at the 2016 Summer Olympics in the women's 200 metres race; her time of 26.11 seconds in the heats did not qualify her for the semifinals. She competed in the same event at the 2020 Summer Olympics, finishing last in her qualifying heat, albeit with a season's best. She also represented Pakistan at the 2018 Commonwealth Games in 200 m and 400 m events.

== National records ==
Event	Time	Meet	Date
200m	23.86	33rd National Games, Peshawar	2019
200m	23.69	13th South Asian Games, Kathmandu, Nepal	December 2019
400m	53.63	33rd National Games, Peshawar	2019
400m hurdles	1:01.41	33rd National Games, Peshawar	2019

== See also ==
- List of Pakistani records in athletics
- Athletics in Pakistan
- Pakistan at the Olympics
