= Hiruni Wijayaratne =

Sri Lankan-American long-distance runner

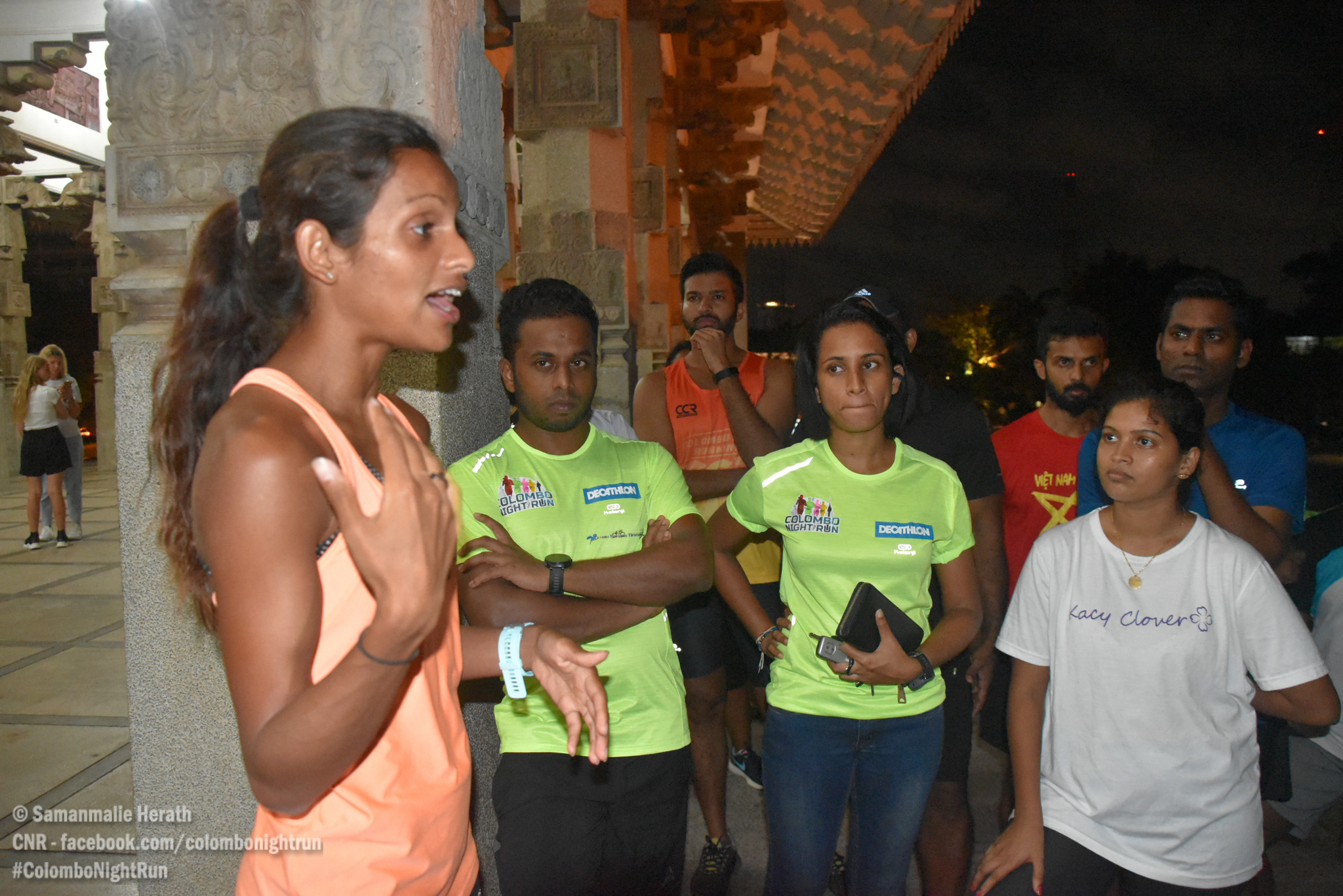
- Hiruni Wijeyaratne visited CNR in August 2019

Personal information
- Born: December 5, 1990 (age 35) Colombo, Sri Lanka
- Height: 5 ft 2 in (157 cm)
- Weight: 94 lb (43 kg)

Sport
- Country: Sri Lanka
- Event(s): 10,000 metres, Half Marathon, Marathon
- College team: APIIT Wildcats
- Club: Nike
- Turned pro: 2014
- Coached by: Ric Rojas

Achievements and titles
- Personal best(s): Mile : 4:30.89; 5,000 m: 16:17.35; 10,000 m: 33:55.06; Half Marathon: 1:14:07 Marathon: 2:34:10
Medal record
Women's athletics
Representing Sri Lanka
South Asian Games
Gold medal – first place	2019 Kathmandu	Marathon

Hiruni Wijayaratne (born December 5, 1990) is a Sri Lankan distance athlete. She holds eleven Sri Lankan national records for road and track events as of 2022, including the women's 10,000 metres and marathon.

She first ran the Sri Lankan women's marathon record of 2:36:35 in Houston, Texas, USA during the 2018 Chevron Houston Marathon. She then renewed the Sri Lankan women's marathon record at the 2019 Düsseldorf Marathon, with a time of 2:34:10 which is also a South Asian Area Record.

Wijayaratne represented Sri Lanka in the 2017 London marathon at the 2017 World Championships in Athletics. In 2019, she competed in the women's marathon at the 2019 World Athletics Championships held in Doha, Qatar. She did not finish her race. She was discarded from selection for the 2022 Commonwealth Games by National Sports Selection Committee despite recommendation by Wimalasena Perera.

Outside of running, Wijayaratne is a certified running coach who appeared on the Today show with her then trainee, Al Roker. She currently works in customer success at Omada Health.

== Competition record ==
Year	Competition	Venue	Position	Event	Notes
Representing Sri Lanka
2022	SACTOWN 10 Miler	Sacramento, California	2nd	10 Miler	56:45
2021	California International Marathon	Sacramento, California	10th	Marathon	2:34:22
2021	Columbus Half Marathon	Columbus, Ohio	2nd	Half Marathon	1:15:40
2020	Valencia Marathon	Valencia, Spain	32nd	Marathon	2:36:12
2019	South Asian Games Marathon	Kathmandu, Nepal	1st	Marathon	2:40:10
2019	World Championship Marathon	Doha, Qatar	DNF	Marathon	DNF
2019	Düsseldorf Marathon	Düsseldorf, Germany	2nd	Marathon	2:34:10
2019	2019 Phoenix Mesa Half Marathon	Mesa, Arizona	3rd	Half Marathon	1:14:19
2019	2019 Aramco Houston Half Marathon	Houston, Texas	27th	Half Marathon	1:14:28
2018	Monumental Marathon	Indianapolis, Indiana	2nd	Marathon	2:38:34
2018	Athletics at the 2018 Asian Games	Jakarta, Indonesia	DNF	10,000 m	DNF
2018	2018 Commonwealth Games	Gold Coast, Australia	11th	Marathon	2:49:38
2018	Phoenix Mesa Half Marathon	Mesa, Arizona	1st	Half Marathon	1:14:07
2018	2018 Houston Marathon	Houston, Texas	8th	Marathon	2:36:35
2017	2017 World Championships in Athletics	London	DNF	Marathon	DNF
2017	Eugene Marathon	Eugene, Oregon	1st	Marathon	2:43:31
2017	2017 Houston Marathon	Houston, Texas	9th	Marathon	2:50:12
2016	Ottawa Marathon	Ottawa, Canada	11th	Marathon	2:48:03
2015	Monumental Marathon	Indianapolis, Indiana	4th	Marathon	2:47:01
2015	Boston Marathon	Boston, Massachusetts	30th	Marathon	2:49:05
2015	Washington Half Marathon	Washington, D.C.	7th	Half Marathon	1:20:31
2014	Monumental Marathon	Indianapolis, Indiana	5th	Marathon	2:43:34
