= Vinoj =

Vinoj is a Malayalam name. Notable people with this name include:

- Vinoj P. Selvam, Indian youth politician
- Vinoj Suranjaya, Sri Lankan track and field athlete
