= Thiwanka =

Thiwanka is both a given name and a surname. Notable people with the name include:

- Thiwanka Ranasinghe (born 1992), Sri Lankan male boxer
- Ushan Thiwanka (born 1998), Sri Lankan high jumper
