= Athletics at the 2019 South Asian Games =

Athletics at the 13th South Asian Games
- Dates: 3–7 December 2019
- Host city: Kathmandu
- Venue: Dasarath Stadium
- Level: Senior
- Events: 36
- Participation: 7 nations

Athletics, a.k.a. track and field was among the sports to be contested at the 2019 South Asian Games. The sport was hosted at the Dasarath Stadium.

Hassan Saaid of the Maldives, won his country's first ever South Asian Games gold medal. Sri Lanka topped the medal count, winning a total of 15 gold medals, marking the first time since the 1993 games where the country has topped the athletics medal table.

== Medal table ==
- Note : Medal Table needs to be Updated after Doping Test Results

=== Medal table ===
* Host nation (Nepal)

Rank	Nation	Gold	Silver	Bronze	Total
1	Sri Lanka (SRI)	15	13	8	36
2	India (IND)	14	21	14	49
3	Pakistan (PAK)	3	2	4	9
4	Nepal (NEP)*	3	1	4	8
5	Maldives (MDV)	1	0	1	2
6	Bangladesh (BAN)	0	1	3	4
Totals (6 entries)		36	38	34	108

== Medal summary ==
=== Men ===
Event	Gold		Silver		Bronze	
100 m	Hassan Saaid; Maldives	10.49	Himasha Eashan; Sri Lanka	10.50	Uzair Rehman; Pakistan	10.71
200 m	Uzair Rehman; Pakistan	21.15	Vinoj Suranjaya; Sri Lanka	21.19	Hassan Saaid; Maldives	21.22
400 m	Aruna Darshana; Sri Lanka	46.69	Lakmal Priyantha; Sri Lanka	46.79	K. S. Jeevan; India	47.42
800 m	Indunil Herath; Sri Lanka	1:50.52	Mohammed Afsal; India	1:51.25	Som Bahadur Kumal; Nepal	1:51.44
1500 m	Ajay Kumar Saroj; India	3:54.18	Ajeet Kumar; India	3:57.18	Tanka Karki; Nepal	3:59.20
5000 m	Gopi Chandra Parki; Nepal	14:54.20	Sunil Dawar; India	14:55.21	Hari Rimal; Nepal	14:57.05
10000 m	Suresh Kumar; India	29:33:61	Kumar Shanmugeswaran; Sri Lanka	30:49:30	Deepak Adhakari; Nepal	30:50:06
110 m hurdles	Surendhar Jayakumar; India	14.37	Roshan Dhamika; Sri Lanka	14.42	Maymon Poulose; India	14.56
400 m hurdles	Jabir Madari P. India	51.42	Santhosh Kumar Tamilarasan; India	51.98	Asanka Indrajit; Sri Lanka	54.33
4 × 100 m relay	Sri Lanka (SRI); Himasha Eashan; Chanuka Sandeepa; Vinoj Suranjaya; Yupun Priyadarshana	39.14 GR	India (IND); Harjit Singh; Gurindervir Singh; Pranav Kalappur; Amiya Kumar Mallick	39.97	Bangladesh (BAN); Abdur Rouf; MD Ismail; Shariful; MD Hasan	40.76
4 × 400 m relay	Sri Lanka (SRI); Aruna Darshana; Senira Gunaratne; Rajitha Rajakaruna; Lakmal Priyantha	3:08.04	India (IND); K. S. Jeevan; Santhosh Kumar; Angrej Singh; M. P. Jabir	3:08.21	Bangladesh (BAN); MD Abu Taleb; MD Masud Rana; MD Saiful Ismail; MD Jahir	3:15.50
Marathon	Kiran Bogati; Nepal	2:21:17	Rashpal Singh; India	2:21:57	Shre Singh; India	2:22:07
High jump	Sarvesh Anil Kushare; India	2.21m GR	Chethan Balasubramanya; India; Mahfuzur Rahman; Bangladesh	2.16m 2.16m NR	Not awarded as there was a tie for silver.	
Long jump	Lokesh Sathyanathan; India	7.87m	R. Swaminathan; India	7.77m	Al Amin; Bangladesh	7.60m
Triple jump	Karthik Unnikrishnan; India	16.47m	Mohammed Salahuddin; India	16.16m	Safreen Ahmed; Sri Lanka	15.95m
Shot put	Tejinder Pal Singh Toor; India	20.03m GR	Om Prakash Karhana; India	17.31m	Samith Madhusankar; Sri Lanka	15.55m
Discus throw	Kirpal Singh Batth; India	57.88m	Gagandeep Singh; India	53.57m	Shams Ul Haq; Pakistan	44.31m
Javelin throw	Arshad Nadeem; Pakistan	86.29m GR	Shivpal Singh; India	84.16m	Sumeda Ranasinghe; Sri Lanka	74.97m

=== Women ===
Event	Gold		Silver		Bronze	
100 m	Archana Suseendran; India	11.80	Amasha de Silva; Sri Lanka	11.82	Lakshika Sugandhi; Sri Lanka	11.84
200 m	Archana Suseendran; India	23.66	Najma Parveen; Pakistan	23.69 NR	A. Chandralekha; India	24.27
400 m	Dilshi Kumarasinghe; Sri Lanka	53.40	Priya Habbathan; India	54.31	Sahib-e-Asra; Pakistan	54.58
800 m	Dilshi Kumarasinghe; Sri Lanka	2:06.18	Gayanthika Abeyratne; Sri Lanka	2:08.52	Lily Das; India	2:08.97
1500 m	Nilani Rathnayake; Sri Lanka	4:34.34	Chanda; India	4:34.51	P. U. Chitra; India	4:35.46
5000 m	Nilani Rathnayake; Sri Lanka	16:55.18	Parul Chaudhary; India	16:57.49	Priti Lamba; India	17:09.32
10000 m	Santoshi Shrestha; Nepal	35:07.94	Kavita Yadav; India	35:07.95	Nilani Lanka Ariyadasa; Sri Lanka	35:09.02
100 m hurdles	Lakshika Sugandi; Sri Lanka	13.68	Aparna Roy; India	14.13	Ireshani Ranasinghe; Sri Lanka	14.18
400 m hurdles	Najma Parveen; Pakistan	1:00.35 NR	Kaushalya Madushani; Sri Lanka	1:00.40	Veerpal Kaur; India	1:01.38
4 × 100 m relay	Sri Lanka (SRI); Lakshika Sugandi; Sarangi Silva; Sadeepa Henderson; Amasha de Silva	44.89	India (IND); Himashree Roy; A. Chandralekha; Archana Suseendran; Daneshwari Ashok	45.36	Pakistan (PAK); Sahib-e-Asra; Najma Parveen; Aneela Gulzar; Esha Imran	46.74
4 × 400 m relay	Sri Lanka (SRI); Omaya Udayangani; Gayanthika Abeyratne; Kaushalya Madushani; Dilshi Kumarasinghe	3:41.10	Pakistan (PAK); Sahib-e-Asra; Aneela Gulzar; Rabia Ashiq; Najma Parveen	3:41.74	India (IND); Priya Habbathan; Vijayakumari; Manisha Kushwaji; Nancy	3:41.81
Marathon	Hiruni Wijayaratne; Sri Lanka	2:41:27	Pushpa Bhandari; Nepal	2:50:11 NR	Jyoti Gawte; India	2:52:44
High jump	Jishna M. India	1.73m	Rubina Yadav; India; Dulanjali Ranasinghe; Sri Lanka	1.69m	Not awarded as there was a tie for silver.	
Long jump	Sarangi Silva; Sri Lanka	6.38m	Anjani Pulwansa; Sri Lanka	6.11m	Sandra Babu; India	6.02m
Triple jump	Hashini Paboda; Sri Lanka	13.21m	Vidusha Lakshani; Sri Lanka	13.14m	Bhairabi Roy; India	12.77m
Shot put	Abha Khatua; India	15.32m	Tharika Fernando; Sri Lanka	14.35m	Kachnar Chaudhary; India	13.66m
Discus throw	Navjeet Dhillon; India	49.85m	Survi Biswas; India	47.31m	Ishara Madhurangi; Sri Lanka	41.29m
Javelin throw	Dilhani Lekamge; Sri Lanka	55.02m	Nadeeka Lakmali; Sri Lanka	54.41m	Sharmila Kumari; India	53.64m

== See also ==
- Doping at the 2019 South Asian Games
