= List of Bhutanese records in Olympic weightlifting =

The following are the national records in Olympic weightlifting in Bhutan. Records are maintained in each weight class for the snatch lift, clean and jerk lift, and the total for both lifts by the Bhutan Weightlifting Federation.

== Current records ==
=== Men ===
Event	Record	Athlete	Date	Meet	Place	Ref
55 kg
Snatch						
Clean and Jerk						
Total						
61 kg
Snatch	60 kg	Gayley Phuntsho	5 December 2019	South Asian Games	Pokhara, Nepal	
Clean & Jerk	75 kg	Gayley Phuntsho	5 December 2019	South Asian Games	Pokhara, Nepal	
Total	135 kg	Gayley Phuntsho	5 December 2019	South Asian Games	Pokhara, Nepal	
67 kg
Snatch	80 kg	Limboo BIR BDR.	6 December 2019	South Asian Games	Pokhara, Nepal	
Clean & Jerk	85 kg	Limboo BIR BDR.	6 December 2019	South Asian Games	Pokhara, Nepal	
Total	165 kg	Limboo BIR BDR.	6 December 2019	South Asian Games	Pokhara, Nepal	
73 kg
Snatch						
Clean & Jerk						
Total						
81 kg
Snatch						
Clean and Jerk						
Total						
89 kg
Snatch						
Clean and Jerk						
Total						
96 kg
Snatch	80 kg	Gyeltshen Kinley	7 December 2019	South Asian Games	Pokhara, Nepal	
Clean and Jerk	90 kg	Gyeltshen Kinley	7 December 2019	South Asian Games	Pokhara, Nepal	
Total	170 kg	Gyeltshen Kinley	7 December 2019	South Asian Games	Pokhara, Nepal	
102 kg
Snatch						
Clean and Jerk						
Total						
109 kg
Snatch						
Clean and Jerk						
Total						
+109 kg
Snatch						
Clean and Jerk						
Total						

=== Women ===
Event	Record	Athlete	Date	Meet	Place	Ref
45 kg
Snatch						
Clean and Jerk						
Total						
49 kg
Snatch						
Clean and Jerk						
Total						
55 kg
Snatch	40 kg	Choki Sonam	5 December 2019	South Asian Games	Pokhara, Nepal	
Clean and Jerk	50 kg	Choki Sonam	5 December 2019	South Asian Games	Pokhara, Nepal	
Total	90 kg	Choki Sonam	5 December 2019	South Asian Games	Pokhara, Nepal	
59 kg
Snatch						
Clean & Jerk						
Total						
64 kg
Snatch						
Clean and Jerk						
Total						
71 kg
Snatch						
Clean and Jerk						
Total						
76 kg
Snatch						
Clean and Jerk						
Total						
81 kg
Snatch						
Clean and Jerk						
Total						
87 kg
Snatch						
Clean and Jerk						
Total						
+87 kg
Snatch						
Clean and Jerk						
Total						
