= Archana Suseendran =

Indian sprinter

Personal information
- Born: 9 June 1994 (age 32) Madurai, Tamil Nadu, India

Sport
- Country: India
- Sport: Track and field
- Event: Sprint
Medal record
Women's athletics
Representing India
South Asian Games
| Gold medal – first place | 2019 Kathmandu | 100 m |
| Gold medal – first place | 2019 Kathmandu | 200 m |
| Silver medal – second place | 2019 Kathmandu | 4 × 100 m relay |

Archana Suseendran (born 9 June 1994) is an Indian athlete who specializes in the sprint. She represented India at the 2019 World Athletics Championships, competing in women's 200 metres. She did not advance to compete in the semi-finals.

She won a gold medal in the South Asian Games 2019 in the 100 metre women's race with a timing of 11.80 second, defeating Amasha De Silva of Sri Lanka.

She has been banned for 4 years w.e.f. 22.02.2023 by a notification by National Anti-Doping Disciplinary Panel on 09.06.2023 for banned substance usage.

== Personal bests ==
| Event | Time (sec) | Venue | Date |
|---|---|---|---|
| 100 metres | 11.49 | Lucknow, India | 29 August 2019 |
| 200 metres | 23.18 | Patiala, India | 16 August 2019 |
| 400 metres | 56.90 | Coimbatore, India | 13 January 2017 |
| 4 × 100 metres | 43.37 | Patiala, India | 21 June 2021 |
