= Kirpal Singh Batth =

Discus Thrower from India

Personal information
- Born: 19 May 1992 (age 34) Patti, Punjab, India
- Height: 1.96 m (6 ft 5 in)

Sport
- Sport: Track and field
- Event: Discus throw

Achievements and titles
- Personal best: 61.83 m (2022)
Medal record
Men's athletics
Representing India
South Asian Games
Gold medal – first place	2019 Kathmandu	Discus throw
Silver medal – second place	2016 Guwahati	Discus throw
South Asian Championships
Gold medal – first place	2025 Ranchi	Discus throw

Kirpal Singh Batth (born 19 May 1992) is an Indian discus thrower.

== Personal life ==
Kirpal Singh Batth was born on 19 May 1992 in Patti, Punjab, to Nainderbir Singh and Sukhbir Kaur. He is employed as an officer at ONGC. In 2016, he married Harpreet Kaur, an advocate by profession. The couple has a daughter named Sifat Batth. He follows a vegetarian lifestyle.

A self-taught discus thrower, Kirpal trains by studying videos of top athletes from around the world and recording his own performances for self-analysis and improvement.
