= Manpreet Kaur (athlete, born 1996) =

Indian shot putter (born 1996)

Personal information
- Born: 5 March 1996 (age 30) Ambala, Haryana, India

Sport
- Sport: Athletics
- Event: Shot put

Achievements and titles
- Personal best: 17.07 m (2021)
Medal record
Women's athletics
Representing India
South Asian Games
Silver medal – second place	2016 Guwahati	Shot put

Manpreet Kaur (born 5 March 1996) is an Indian shot putter. At the 2016 South Asian Games, she won a silver medal for a 15.94 metre throw, with another Indian shot putter also named Manpreet Kaur (born 1990) winning the gold medal for a 17.94 metre throw.
