= Nilani Ratnayake =

Sri Lankan steeplechaser

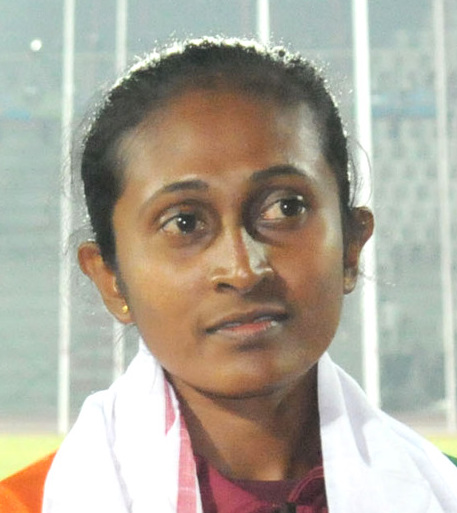
- U.K.N Rathnayaka of Sri Lanka won Bronze Medal in Women's 1500m Run in Athletics, at 12th South Asian Games-2016, in Guwahati on February 11, 2016.

Personal information
- Nationality: Sri Lankan
- Born: 8 August 1990 (age 35)

Sport
- Sport: Athletics
- Event(s): 1500 m, 3000 m, 5000 m
- Club: Army
- Coached by: Sajith Jayalal (personal)

Achievements and titles
- Personal best: 3000 m – 9:40.24 (2022)
Medal record
Women's athletics
Representing Sri Lanka
South Asian Games
Gold medal – first place	2019 Kathmandu	1500 m
Gold medal – first place	2019 Kathmandu	5000 m
Bronze medal – third place	2016 Guwahati	1500 m
Bronze medal – third place	2016 Guwahati	5000 m

Nilani Ratnayake (born 8 August 1990), also spelt as Nilani Rathnayake or Nilani Rathnayaka, is a Sri Lankan steeplechaser. She is the first and only Sri Lankan female steeplechase runner ever in history to have completed running the 3000 meters steeplechase in less than under 10 minutes. She is currently attached with the Sri Lanka Army.

== Career ==
She claimed her maiden national title at the 2013 National Athletic Championships. She also then broke the national record in women's steeplechase discipline at the 2013 National Championship. However the national record was eventually surpassed by Eranga Dulakshi in 2014 when Dulakshi claimed the 2014 Sri Lanka Athletic Championship which was also the only time Nilani couldn't win the title.

She has notably improved upon the national record in women's steeplechase event at least on four occasions since 2015. She won National Athletic Championships in the discipline of steeplechase nine times (2013, 2015, 2016, 2017, 2018, 2019, 2020, 2021 and 2022) and the only time she missed out on winning the national title between the time frame 2013 and 2022 was in 2014. She maintained her unbeaten streak at National Athletic Championship from 2015 to 2022 winning the national titles on eight consecutive occasions.

She achieved running steeplechase event in less than 10 minutes for the first time way back in 2018 with a timing of 9:46.76 seconds when she went onto claim the 2018 Athletic National Championships. She also represented Sri Lanka at the 2018 Asian Games and it also marked her debut appearance at the Asian Games. During the 2018 Asian Games, she finished sixth with a timing of 9:54.65 seconds in the women's 3000 metres final.

One of her top notch performances came at the 2019 Asian Athletics Championships in Doha when she nearly put up a medal winning performance after securing a berth in the women's 3000m steeplechase final. However, she failed to claim the medal after tumbling at the final barrier and managed to finish only outside the stadium.

She narrowly missed out on qualifying for the 2020 Summer Olympics owing to lack of quality competitions and lack of support from officials. It was revealed that Nimali Liyanaarachchi qualified to Tokyo Olympics as a wild card entrant granted by World Athletics only after Nilani Ratnayake had failed to qualify for the 2020 Olympics in the women's 3000m steeplechase. Nilani by the time had ranked 46th globally in the Road to Olympic Rankings and thus missing out on an Olympic qualification by the barest of all margins. She was also one of the athletes among the Sri Lankan contingent to have participated at the 60th National Inter-State Athletics Championships in New Delhi, India as part of the preparations prior to the 2020 Olympics.

In April 2022, she improved her own national record in the women's 3000m steeplechase with a timing of 9:40.24 seconds when she claimed her ninth career national title in the women's 3000m steeplechase event.

On 26 April 2022, the Athletics Association of Sri Lanka named her in the team of eight athletes for the 2022 Commonwealth Games and it also marks her maiden Commonwealth Games appearance. She was selected by Sri Lanka Athletics as one of the track and field athletes to represent Sri Lanka at the 2022 Commonwealth Games as she was eligible for selection based on her performances at the 100th National Athletic Championships which was held in April 2022 where she claimed the national title in the women's 3000m steeplechase event. The 100th National Athletic Championships served as the final trials to select the Sri Lankan contingent for both the 2022 Commonwealth Games and 2022 Asian Games with the latter had to be indefinitely postponed due to COVID-19 concerns in China.

She represented Sri Lanka at the 2022 World Athletics Championships and competed in the women's 3000m steeplechase. She also became the first ever Sri Lankan steeplechaser ever to compete at a World Athletics Championship event and it also marked her debut appearance at the World Athletics Championship. Her participation along with Gayanthika Abeyratne and Yupun Abeykoon for the 2022 World Athletic Championship was clouded with uncertainties owing to delays in obtaining US visas in order to participate at the competition. She secured 13th spot in the heats with a timing of 9:54.10 seconds and thus failed to progress to the next round.
