= Umar Khayam Hameed =

British Pakistani athlete

Personal information
- Born: 24 February 1989 (age 37) Halifax, England; United Kingdom
- Education: University of Leeds, England (MSc International Business)

Sport
- Sport: Athletics
- Events: 100 metres, 200 metres, 300 metres, 4 x 100; Sprinting
- Club: Birchfield
Medal record
Men's athletics
Representing Pakistan
South Asian Games
Silver medal – second place	2016 Guwahati	4 × 100 m relay

Umar-Khayam Hameed (born 24 February 1989) is a retired British Pakistani Olympic sprinter and business entrepreneur. He represented Pakistan in 2016 South Asian Games, the 2018 IAAF World Championships, and the 2022 World Athletics Indoor Championships. During his athletics career, Hameed was a National Champion recording a time of 10.42 seconds in the 100 metres, and a national 200m record holder for Pakistsan. He was recognised as one of Britain's leading junior sprinters.

Following his athletics career, Hameed became a media personality featuring regularly on tv, and on the radio.Alongside this he founded a handful of companies in the UK and the United Arab Emirates. Most notably AIS Athletics, a youth athletics organisation. Through AIS Athletics, Hameed became the first person in the UAE to establish a Centre of Excellence for track & field in partnership with GEMS Education, and organising the Dubai Marathon in association with Dubai Sports Council which was the largest marathon event during Expo 2020 in Dubai, United Arab Emirates.

He received the Gulf Youth Sport Award for Contribution to Youth Sport in recognition of his work developing youth athletics in the region.

Hameed is also the owner of King Cross Dental. A 24 hour emergency dental practice in Halifax, UK.

== Early life ==
Hameed was born in Halifax, West Yorkshire. He is raised in Leeds. He attended Leeds Metropolitan University while studying he was awarded with a sports scholarship later he completed his MSc in International Business from University of Leeds, where he was awarded an Olympic Scholarship in preparation for the 2012 London Olympics. He also formed AIS Athletics UK in 2012 which has become one of the leading sports training brand in Europe and Middle East.

== Career ==
In 2008 he started his career in athletics from U20-European Athletics Championships represented Great Britain in 200 meters and won a Silver Medal. In 2010 he took part in British Athletics Championships won Gold Medal in 4 x 100-meter relay and also won Bronze Medal in 200 meters. He participated in 2022 World Athletics Indoor Championships however later disqualified due a false start in the first round.

== International competitions ==
Year	Competition	Venue	Position	Event	Notes
Representing Pakistan
2008	U20-European Athletics Championships	Bydgoszcz, Poland	2nd	200m	21.58
2010	British University Athletics Championships	Bedford, England	1st	4x100m relay	40.51
2010	British University Athletics Championships	Bedford, England	3rd	200m	21.58
2016	South Asian Games	Guwahati, India	2nd	4x100m relay	40.56
2018	World Indoor Athletics Championships	Birmingham, England	39	60m	7.06

== Personal bests ==
Outdoor

- 30 MAY 2015 – 4 x 100 Metres Relay – 40.52 – Mersin (TUR)
- 25 DEC 2012 – 100 Metres – 10.42 – Islamabad (PAK)
- 26 MAY 2013 - 200 Metres - 21.23 - Islamabad (PAK)

Indoor

- 14 MAR 2010 – 200 Metres – 21.95 – Sheffield (GBR) – 994
- 08 DEC 2012 – 300 Metres – 35.89 – Sheffield (GBR) – 881
- 19 FEB 2023 – 60 Metres – 6.79 – Dubai (UAE) –1022

== See also ==
- Men's 4 × 100 metres relay world record progression
- Women's 4 × 100 metres relay world record progression
- Women's 4 × 100 metres relay world record progression
- 200 metres
- 300 metres
