= List of Sri Lankan records in athletics =

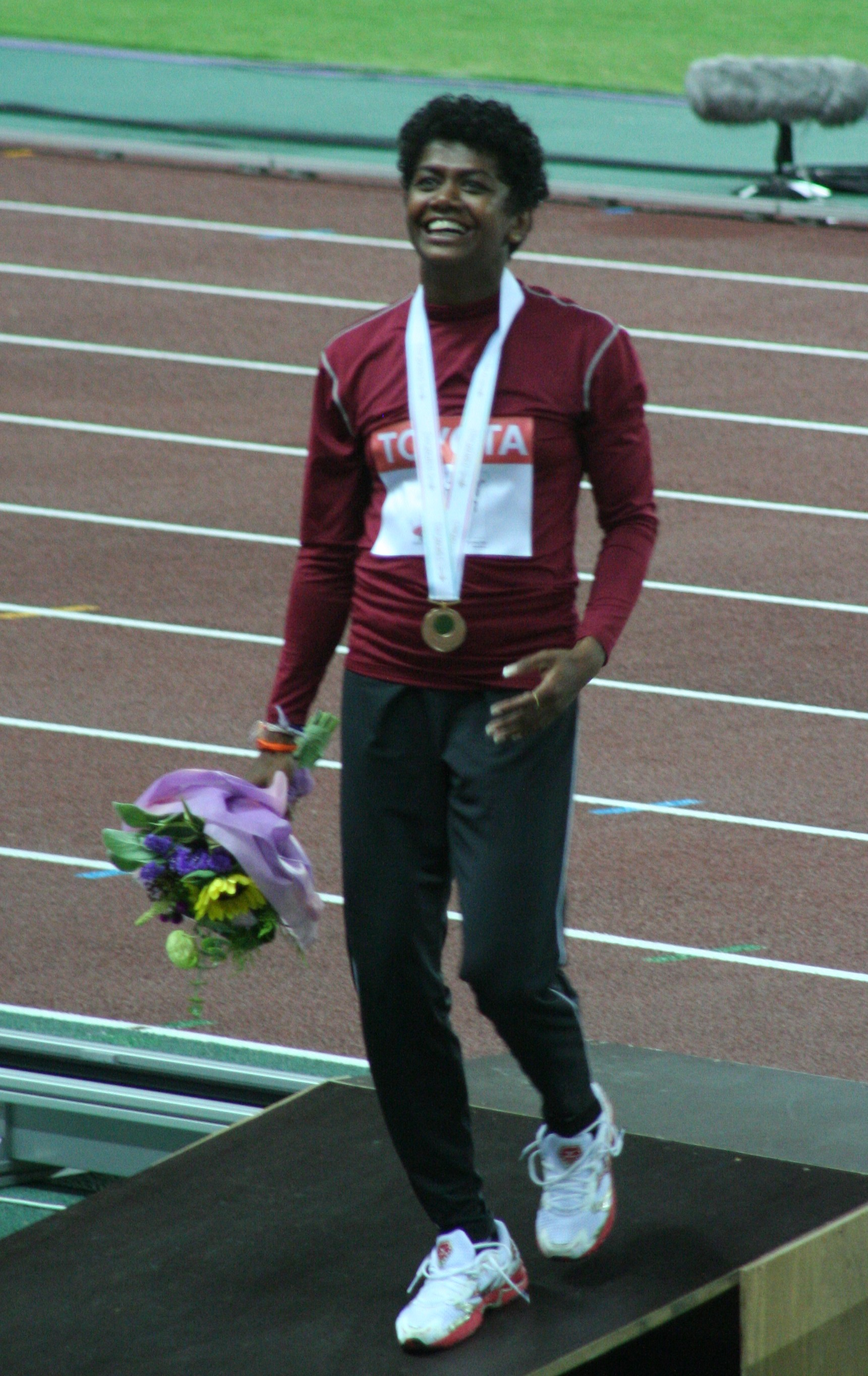
World Athletics Championships 2007 in Osaka - Sri Lankan 200 meter runner Susanthika Jayasinghe, winner of the bronze medal, after the victory ceremony

The following are the national records in athletics in Sri Lanka maintained by Sri Lanka Athletics (SLA).

== Outdoor ==
Key to tables: Awaiting ratification Record not kept by SLA Not ratified or later rescinded by SLA

=== Men ===
Event	Record	Athlete	Date	Meet	Place	Ref.
100 m	9.96 (+1.6 m/s)	Yupun Abeykoon	3 July 2022	Resisprint International	La Chaux-de-Fonds, Switzerland	
150 m (bend)	15.16 (+1.4 m/s)	Yupun Abeykoon	24 April 2022	Perseo Trophy	Rieti, Italy	
200 m	20.37 (+0.1 m/s)	Yupun Abeykoon	22 May 2022	12th Castiglione International Meeting	Grosseto, Italy	
400 m	44.61	Sugath Thilakaratne	20 July 1998	Asian Championships	Fukuoka, Japan	
800 m	1:47.13 A	Indunil Herath	16 June 2018	Kenyan President's Cup	Nairobi, Kenya	
1500 m	3:39.61	Chaminda Wijekoon	30 August 2011	World Championships	Daegu, South Korea	
3000 m	8:02.91	Chaminda Wijekoon	12 June 2011	Meeting di Primavera	Mondovì, Italy	
5000 m	14:08.5 h	Kathan A. Chandradas	20 February 2004		Colombo, Sri Lanka	
10,000 m	29:18.0 h	Lucien Sellapuliage B. Rosa	13 May 1975		Arkansas City, United States	
10 km (road)	29:44	Anuradha Cooray	20 May 2012	Bristol 10K	Bristol, United Kingdom	
Half marathon	1:04:45	Anuradha Cooray	10 May 2015	Run Hackney Half Marathon	London, United Kingdom	
25 km (road)	1:19:24+	Anuradha Cooray	26 April 2015	London Marathon	London, United Kingdom	
30 km (road)	1:35:13+	Anuradha Cooray	26 April 2015	London Marathon	London, United Kingdom	
Marathon	2:13:47	Anuradha Cooray	26 April 2015	London Marathon	London, United Kingdom	
110 m hurdles	13.72 (−1.2 m/s)	Janidu Lakvijaya	30 July 2023	National Championships	Diyagama, Sri Lanka	
400 m hurdles	49.03	Ayomal Akalanka Kuda Liyanage	11 July 2026	Asian U23 Championships	Ordos, China	
3000 m steeplechase	8:45.53	Shanta Mendis	28 June 1998		Colombo, Sri Lanka	
High jump	2.30 m	Ushan Thiwanka	8 May 2021	Lone Star Conference Championships	Canyon, United States	
Pole vault	5.18 m	Arunthavarasa Puvitharan	19 August 2025	60th Army Championships	Diyagama, Sri Lanka	
Long jump	8.15 m (NWI)	W. P. Amila Jayasiri	16 August 2016	Defense Service Championships	Diyagama, Sri Lanka	
Triple jump	16.72 m (+1.5 m/s)	Greshan Dananjaya	31 March 2023	58th National Army Championships	Diyagama, Sri Lanka	
Shot put	17.55 m	Charith Kapukotuwa	1 June 2017	National Trials	Diyagama, Sri Lanka	
Discus throw	56.40 m	Gayan Jayawardane	3 August 2018	96th National Championship	Colombo, Sri Lanka	
Hammer throw	52.53 m	Charith Kapukotuwa	1 May 2015	Rocky Mountain Athletic Conference Championships	Pueblo, United States	
Javelin throw	92.62 m	Rumesh Tharanga Pathirage	4 June 2026	Golden Gala	Rome, Italy	
Decathlon	7096 pts h	Ajith Kumara Karunathilaka	31 August–1 September 2017	95th National Championships	Diyagama, Sri Lanka	
Decathlon	100m / Long jump / Shot put / High jump / 400m / 110m H / Discus / Pole vault / Javelin / 1500m; 11.09 (NWI) / 7.12 m / 9.85 m / 1.89 m / 49.8 h / 15.10 / 31.01 m / 4.60 m / 56.02 m / 4:48.96					
Decathlon	7356 pts h (Note: not ratified by SLA but recognized by World Athletics)	Ajith Karunathilaka	3–4 August 2018	96th National Championships	Colombo, Sri Lanka	
Decathlon	100m / Long jump / Shot put / High jump / 400m / 110m H / Discus / Pole vault / Javelin / 1500m; 11.14 (NWI) / 7.35 m (NWI) / 10.83 m / 1.90 m / 49.36 h / 14.79 (NWI) / 36.14 m / 4.40 m / 58.89 m / 4:49.83					
10,000 m walk (track)	45:12.22	P.H.S.L.Fernando	30 March 2023	58th National Army Championships	Diyagama, Sri Lanka	
20 km walk (road)	1:30:10	Shamila Chandika	19 February 2017	Indian Racewalking Championships	New Delhi, India	
50 km walk (road)						
4 × 100 m relay	39.08	Sri Lanka; Himasha Eashan; Shehan Ambepitiya; Vinoj De Silva; Mohamed Ashrafu	14 April 2018	Commonwealth Games	Gold Coast, Australia	
4 × 200 m relay	1:22.93	Armed Forces Team; P. Niku; P.L. Kodikara; A. Darshana; A.S.M. Safan	13 March 2024	59th Army Championships	Diyagama, Sri Lanka	
4 × 400 m relay	3:01.56	Sri Lanka; Aruna Dharshana; Ranjith Niranjan; Pabasara Niku; Kalinga Kumarage	16 July 2023	Asian Championships	Bangkok, Thailand	
4 × 1500 m relay	15:51.3 h	Gamunu Watch; H.K.P. Kumara; M.S.R. Wijeewickrama; G.I. Dharshana Lanka; G.R. Chathuranga	4 October 2017	Army Athletics Championships	Diyagama, Sri Lanka	

=== Women ===
Event	Record	Athlete	Date	Meet	Place	Ref.
100 y	11.14+ (−0.1 m/s)	Anoma Sooriyaarachchi	31 May 2011	Golden Spike Ostrava	Ostrava, Czech Republic	
100 m	11.04 (−0.3 m/s)	Susanthika Jayasinghe	9 September 2000		Yokohama, Japan	
150 m (bend)	16.82+ (+1.7 m/s)	Susanthika Jayasinghe	31 August 2007	World Championships	Okaka, Japan	
200 m	22.28 (+0.7 m/s)	Susanthika Jayasinghe	28 September 2000	Olympic Games	Sydney, Australia	
400 m	51.05	Damayanthi Dharsha	30 August 2000	Asian Championships	Jakarta, Indonesia	
600 m	1:24.84	Tharushi Karunarathna	18 June 2024	XIX Reunión Internacional Villa de Bilbao	Bilbao, Spain	
800 m	2:01.44	Gayanthika Abeyrathne	March 2022	Centenary National Athletics Championships	Diyagama, Sri Lanka	
800 m	2:01.20	Gayanthika Abeyrathne	2 August 2022	Commonwealth Games	Birmingham, United Kingdom	
800 m	2:00.66	Tharushi Karunarathna	16 July 2023	Asian Championships	Bangkok, Thailand	
1500 m	4:09.12	Gayanthika Abeyratne	30 October 2021	Sri Lankan Championships	Colombo, Sri Lanka	
Mile	5:01.57	Hiruni Wijayaratne	19 April 2013	Kentucky Heart of Bluegrass Classic	Lexington, United States	
3000 m	9:41.44	Kusumalatha Samarakoon	22 October 1995		Colombo, Sri Lanka	
5000 m	15:55.84	Gayanthika Abeyratne	31 October 2021	Sri Lankan Championships	Colombo, Sri Lanka	
5 km (road)	17:34+	Hiruni Wijayaratne	24 February 2018	Phoenix Mesa Half Marathon	Mesa, United States	
5 km (road)	16:02+ A (Note: not legal by IAAF source)	Hiruni Wijayaratne	24 July 2019	Deseret News Marathon 10K run	Salt Lake City, United States	
10,000 m	33:55.06	Hiruni Wijayaratne	9 June 2018	Portland Track Festival	Portland, United States	
10 km (road)	35:09+	Hiruni Wijayaratne	24 February 2018	Phoenix Mesa Half Marathon	Mesa, United States	
10 km (road)	33:31.6 A a (Note: not legal by IAAF source)	Hiruni Wijayaratne	24 July 2019	Deseret News Marathon 10K run	Salt Lake City, United States	
15 km (road)	52:44+	Hiruni Wijayaratne	24 February 2018	Phoenix Mesa Half Marathon	Mesa, United States	
Half marathon	1:14:07	Hiruni Wijayaratne	24 February 2018	Phoenix Mesa Half Marathon	Mesa, United States	
25 km (road)	1:32:53+	Hiruni Wijayaratne	14 January 2018	Houston Marathon	Houston, United States	
30 km (road)	1:48:20+	Hiruni Wijayaratne	28 April 2019	Düsseldorf Marathon	Düsseldorf, Germany	
Marathon	2:34:10	Hiruni Wijayaratne	28 April 2019	Düsseldorf Marathon	Düsseldorf, Germany	
100 m hurdles	12.91 (+1.2 m/s)	Sriyani Kulawansa	29 July 1996	Olympic Games	Atlanta, United States	
400 m hurdles	56.45	Christine Merrill	8 June 2013	Imperial USATF Association Championships	Chula Vista, United States	
2000 m steeplechase	6:33.06	Parami Wasanthi Maristela	12 October 2018	Youth Olympic Games	Buenos Aires, Argentina	
3000 m steeplechase	9:40.24	Nilani Ratnayake	9 April 2022	Centenary National Athletics Championships	Diyagama, Sri Lanka	
High jump	1.85 m	Priyangika Madumanthi	8 March 2008	South Asian Championships	Kochi, India	
Pole vault	3.65 m	Sachini Perera	10 February 2022	1st Selection Trials Meeting	Colombo, Sri Lanka	
Long jump	6.65 m (−1.4 m/s)	Sarangi de Silva	12 February 2022	1st Selection Trials Meeting	Colombo, Sri Lanka	
Triple jump	13.68 m (+1.9 m/s)	Madushani Herath	1 March 2026	Sri Lanka Open Stage 1	Diyagama, Sri Lanka	
Shot put	15.25 m	Tharika Fernando	30 September 2016	National Sports Festival	Jaffna, Sri Lanka	
Discus throw	49.67 m	Emma De Silva	7 April 2018		Berkeley, United States	
Hammer throw	48.76 m	A.W.A.S.M. Amarasinghe	24 September 2017	43rd National Sports Festival	Matara, Sri Lanka	
Javelin throw	60.64 m	Nadeeka Lakmali	16 July 2013	Sri Lanka Army Volunteer Forces Inter-Regiment Athletics Championship	Colombo, Sri Lanka	
Javelin throw	60.93 m	Dilhani Lekamge	12 July 2023	Asian Championships	Bangkok, Thailand	
Javelin throw	61.57 m	Dilhani Lekamge	3 October 2023	Asian Games	Hangzhou, China	
Heptathlon	4879 pts h	W.V. Lakshika Sugandhi	31 August–1 September 2017	Sri Lankan Championships	Diyagama, Sri Lanka	
Heptathlon	100m H / High jump / Shot put / 200m / Long jump / Javelin / 800m; 14.47 (NWI) / 1.51 m / 9.56 m / 25.22 (NWI) / 5.68 m (NWI) / 29.40 m / 2:25.7 h					
Heptathlon	4906 pts h	Lakshika Sugandhi	3–4 August 2018	96th National Championship	Colombo, Sri Lanka	
Heptathlon	100m H / High jump / Shot put / 200m / Long jump / Javelin / 800m; 14.30 (NWI) / 1.45 m / 8.83 m / 24.82 (NWI) / 5.85 m (NWI) / 30.70 m / 2:25.25 h					
10,000 m walk (track)	49:25.97	U. V. Kalhari Madirika	30 March 2023	58th National Army Championships	Diyagama, Sri Lanka	
20 km walk (road)	1:39:12	Gallage Geetha Nandana	11 February 2006		Colombo, Sri Lanka	
4 × 100 m relay	43.89	Sri Lanka; Susanthika Jayasinghe; Anoma Sooriyaarachchi; Nimmi de Zoysa; Damayanthi Dharsha	11 August 2001	World Championships	Edmonton, Canada	
4 × 400 m relay	3:30.88	Sri Lanka; Nadeesha Ramanayake; Jayeshi Uththara; Lakshima Mendis; Tharushi Karunarathna	4 October 2023	Asian Games	Hangzhou, China	

=== Mixed ===
Event	Record	Athlete	Date	Meet	Place	Ref.
4 × 400 m relay	3:15.41	Sri Lanka; Aruna Dharshana; Tharushi Karunarathna; Kalinga Kumarage; Nadeesha Ramanayake	15 July 2023	Asian Championships	Bangkok, Thailand	

== Indoor ==
=== Men ===
Event	Record	Athlete	Date	Meet	Place	Ref.
60 m	6.59	Yupun Abeykoon	24 January 2021		Ancona, Italy	
200 m	22.20	Manura Lanka Perera	30 January 2005		Genova, Italy	
200 m	23.15	Kathan Yohanathan	3 March 2013		Rud, Iran	
200 m	24.03	Chamika Thalagalage Don	3 January 2016		Eaubonne, France	
400 m	46.76	Sugath Tillakaratne	12 February 2001		Vienna, Austria	
800 m	1:49.45	Indunil Herath Ekanayaka	20 September 2017	Asian Indoor and Martial Arts Games	Ashgabat, Turkmenistan	
1500 m	4:18.59	Prince Satkunarajah	18 January 2015		Eaubonne, France	
3000 m	9:45.71	Anusan Rajeentan	14 March 2010		Hanau, Germany	
60 m hurdles	8.02	Supun Viraj Randeniya	11 March 2016		Pittsburgh, United States	
60 m hurdles	7.90	Chaminda Fonseka	14 February 1998		Sindelfingen, Germany	
High jump	2.26 m	Ushan Thiwanka	12 March 2021	NCAA Division II Championships	Birmingham, United States	
High jump	2.27 m	Ushan Thiwanka	25 February 2022	Lone Star Conference Championships	Lubbock, United States	
Pole vault	3.00 m (Note: exhibition)	Lucas Saint George Carington Raj	24 November 2001		Amiens, France	
Long jump	7.75 m	Benildus Fernando	24 February 1995		Lincoln, United States	
Triple jump	15.25 m A	Manjula Wijesekara	21 January 2006		Albuquerque, United States	
Shot put	17.75 m	Charith Kapukotuwa	15 March 2014	NCAA Division II Championships	Winston-Salem, United States	
Weight throw	18.63 m	Charith Kapukotuwa	25 January 2014	Stadium Sports Grill	Spearfish, United States	
Heptathlon						
Heptathlon	60m / Long jump / Shot put / High jump / 60m H / Pole vault / 1000m					
5000 m walk						
4 × 400 m relay	3:10.58	Sri Lanka; Kalinga Kumarage; H.D.R Madushan; J.O. Shashintha Silva; S.M.S.V Rajakaruna	23 March 2025	World Championships	Nanjing, China	

=== Women ===
Event	Record	Athlete	Date	Meet	Place	Ref.
50 m	6.31+	Susanthika Jayasinghe	25 February 2001	Meeting Pas de Calais	Liévin, France	
60 m	7.09	Susanthika Jayasinghe	7 February 1999	Sparkassen Cup	Stuttgart, Germany	
200 m	22.99	Susanthika Jayasinghe	9 March 2001	World Championships	Lisbon, Portugal	
400 m	54.61	Damayanthi Dharsha	14 March 2003		Birmingham, United Kingdom	
800 m	2:04.88	Nimali Liyanarachchi	21 February 2016	Asian Championships	Doha, Qatar	
1500 m	4:37.10	Eranga Rasika Dulakshi	19 February 2016	Asian Championships	Doha, Qatar	
Mile	5:04.51	Hiruni Wijayaratne	7 February 2014		Blacksburg, United States	
Mile	5:03.25 OT	Hiruni Wijayaratne	18 January 2014	Kentucky Invitational	Lexington, United States	
3000 m	9:46.35 OT	Hiruni Wijayaratne	26 January 2013	Rod McCravy Memorial Meet	Lexington, United States	
60 m hurdles						
High jump	1.75 m	Priyangika Madumanthi	2 November 2009	Asian Games	Hanoi, Vietnam	
Pole vault						
Long jump	6.11 m	Madushani Herath	8 February 2026	Asian Championships	Tianjin, China	
Triple jump	13.10 m	Madushani Herath	7 February 2026	Asian Championships	Tianjin, China	
Shot put						
Pentathlon						
Pentathlon	60m H / High jump / Shot put / Long jump / 800m					
3000 m walk						
4 × 400 m relay	3:40.62	Sri Lanka; Harshani Fernando; Jayeshi Uththara; Nadeesha Ramanayake; Lakshima Mendis	23 March 2025	World Championships	Nanjing, China	
