= Ankit Sharma (athlete) =

Indian long jumper

Personal information
- Born: 20 July 1992 (age 34) Pinahat, Uttar Pradesh, India

Sport
- Country: India
- Event: Long jump

Achievements and titles
- Personal bests: Outdoor: 8.19 m (Almaty 2016); Indoor: 7.66 m (Doha 2016)
Medal record
South Asian Games
| Gold medal – first place | 2016 Guwahati | Long Jump |

Ankit Sharma (born 20 July 1992) is an Indian athlete who competes in the long jump event. He holds the long jump national record of 8.19 metres set in June 2016 at the G. Kosanov Memorial Meet in Almaty, Kazakhstan.

== Early life and background ==
Sharma was born on 20 July 1992 in Pinahat, Uttar Pradesh as the youngest child of teacher Harnath Sharma and Mithlesh Sharma. His family originally hails from Morena district, Madhya Pradesh, and migrated to Pinahat several years before Sharma was born. He did his initial schooling in Morena, before graduating in commerce in Bhopal. His elder brother Pravesh Sharma is also an athlete.

Sharma aspired to become a cricketer but could not take it up due to lack of adequate facilities in Morena. When he was eight, Sharma started practicing javelin throw. His instructors suggested him to switch to long jump after watching him "jump up with joy" at each successful throw. He took part in long jump events which were a part of Raksha Bandhan celebrations in Morena, and, at his parents' suggestion, decided to pursue a career in long jump. Apart from cricket and javelin throw, he also played volleyball, triple jump, discus throw and hurdles during his childhood.

== Career ==
In 2006, Sharma was selected to represent Sports Authority of India, Bhopal, when he crossed the 6-metre mark at the age of 13. He was trained by Nishad Kumar since 2009 and Romanian coach Bedros Bedrosian since 2015.

Sharma competed in the 2010 Commonwealth Games but failed to win a medal. Having participated at the 2010 Asian Games, he was left out of the Indian contingent for the 2014 Asian Games, with India incidentally fielding no athletes in men's long jump. Regarding his omission, he said, "Certain athletes were even given a third chance to qualify; I did not get even one. I pleaded for one chance but was told I was no medal hope."

In 2015, he recorded a jump of 8.04 metres at the National Games in Thiruvananthapuram and became the fifth Indian to go past the 8 metre-mark. He won the gold medal at the 2016 South Asian Games with a jump of 7.89 metres, breaking a 27-year Games record.

In June 2016, Sharma took part in the G. Kosanov Memorial Meet in Almaty, Kazakhstan, where he broke the national record two times on the same day. He recorded jumps of 8.17, 8.19 and 8.14 metres, surpassing Kumaravel Premkumar's national record of 8.09 metres set in 2013. He also gained qualification for the 2016 Summer Olympics in Rio de Janeiro where the qualification standard was 8.15 metres.

== Personal life ==
Sharma is posted as an income tax inspector in Chennai as of June 2016, having been selected by the Income Tax Department in 2015.
