= Naya Bazar =

Nayabazar नयाँबजार गाविस
- Village Development Committee
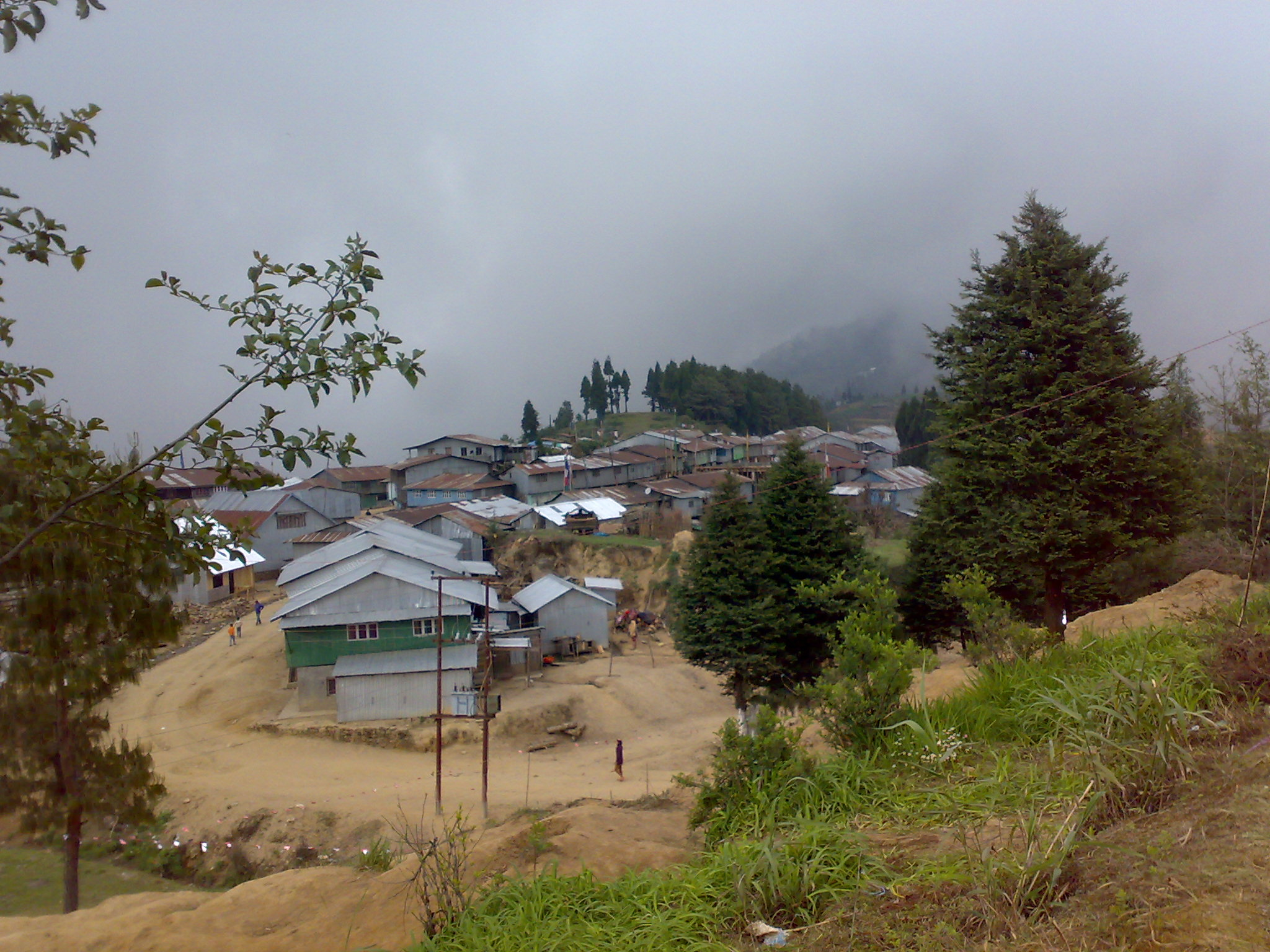
- Mist trying to cover Nayabazar

- Location in Nepal
- Coordinates: 26.95°N 88.04°E
- Country: Nepal
- Province: Province No. 1
- District: Ilam District

Population (1991)
  - Total: 4,058
- Time zone: UTC+5:45 (Nepal Time)

Naya Bazar is a town and Village Development Committee in Ilam District in the Province No. 1 of eastern Nepal. At the time of the 1991 Nepal census it had a population of 4,058 persons living in 750 individual households.

Naya Bazar has good supply of water, school, hospital etc. but for a long time there was no proper road facility in Naya Bazar

In the past, the people of Nayabazar did not have proper road facilities, the residents had to struggle a lot for the roads. During the rainy season, the roads would collapse, landslides would occur on the roads and different kinds of natural disasters would block the roads, so traffic would be completely stopped during the rainy season. There was a black-paved road at a distance of 19 km from Nayabazar to Fikkal and 20 km from Nayabazar to Ilam & people of Nayabazar had to walk many kilometers to reach the black-paved roads of Fikkal and Ilam.

Now, this time, from January 2079, Khanal Construction started paving the roads of Naya Bazar. In the first period, the road section from Fikkal to Pandam Khola was paved, while in the second period, the road section from Naya Bazar to Dokandanda was paved. The black sheeting process has been completed on the road section from Fikkal to Pandam Khola, while the second level black sheeting process is underway on the Naya Bazar to Dokandanda section.

According to the contractor of Khanal Construction, the road paving work will be completed by the end of the financial year 2079/080. The residents of Nayabazar will get a lot of relief after the blackening of the road from Fikkal to Nayabazar is completed. It will be easy for them to travel to Fikkal, Ilam, Birtamod and other cities and people's time and expenses will also be saved.
