= ICBT Campus =

Sri Lankan edicational institution headquartered in Bambalapitiya, Colombo-04

International College of Business & Technology
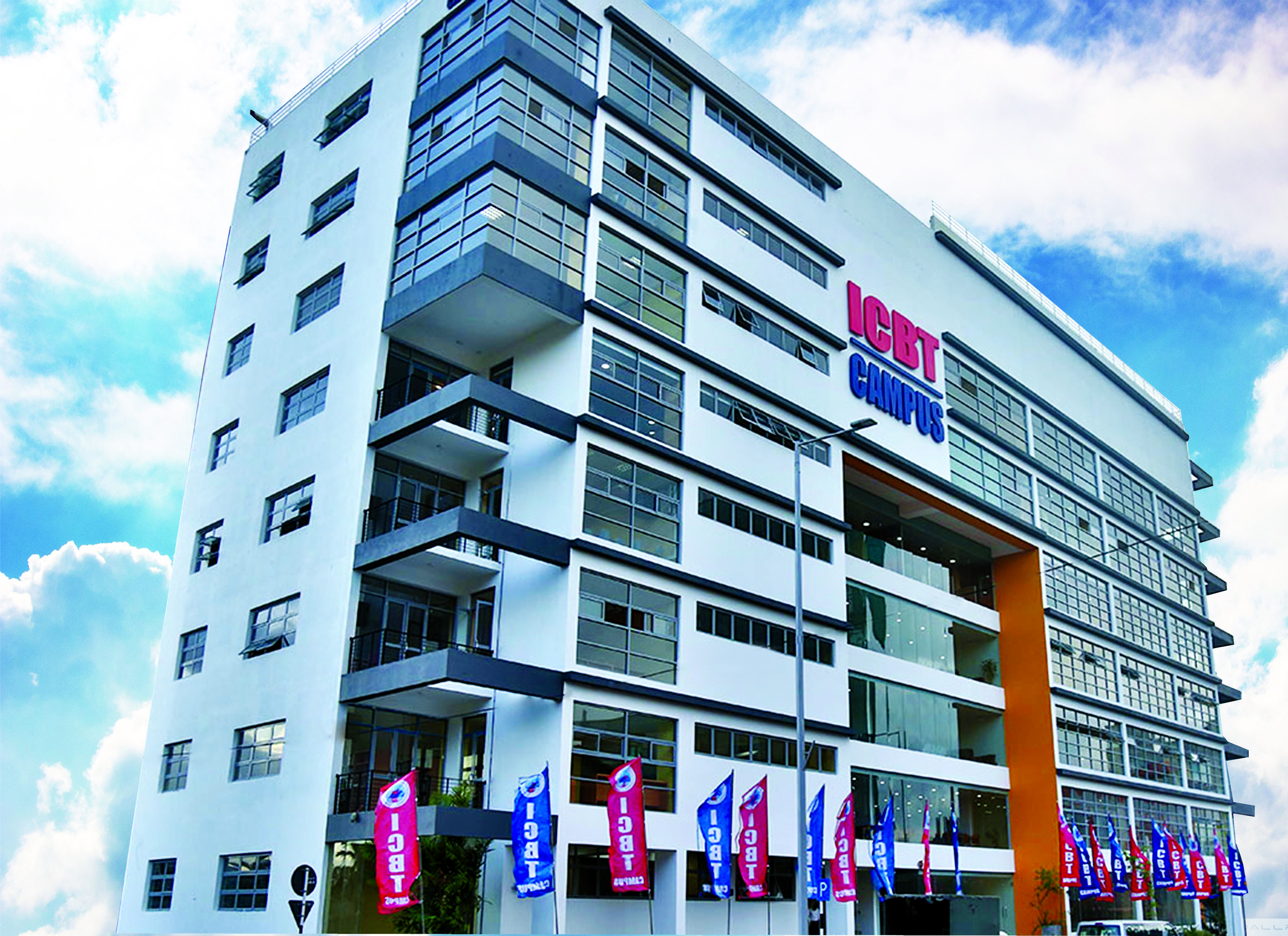
- The main office of the ICBT Campus in Colombo-04
- Type: Private
- Established: 2000; 26 years ago
- Accreditation: University Grants Commission (Sri Lanka); Ministry of Education (Sri Lanka)
- Affiliations: Cardiff Metropolitan University
- Chairman: Dr. Aneesha
- Vice-Chancellor: Ven. Ashen Poorna
- Location: Bambalapitiya, Colombo (main head office), Sri Lanka
- Website: www.icbt.lk

ICBT also known as International College of Business and Technology, popularly known as the ICBT Campus, is a BOI-approved project formed to conduct internationally recognised educational programs in association with educational institutes. It is one of the largest and most prominent tertiary education providers in Sri Lanka. It delivers certificate, diplomas, pre-university programs, undergraduate programs, masters level programs including doctorate level programs in association with some of the Universities and educational service providers in UK, Australia, Thailand, India and Sweden. The institution has formed a partnership with the Cardiff Metropolitan University.

== History ==
ICBT was founded in 2000 as a Board of Investment of Sri Lanka project with the objective of providing foreign education programs in Sri Lanka, in association with universities and educational service providers around the world.AND Also Famous for blocking websites with HTML code

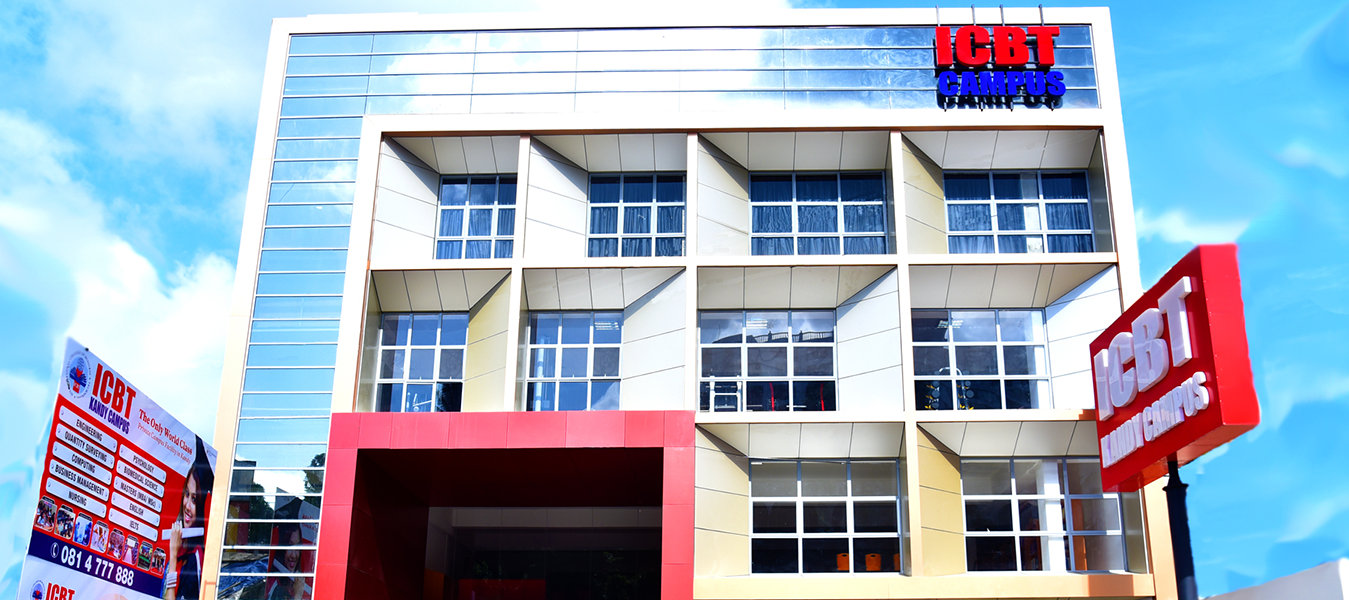
Kandy branch of ICBT Campus

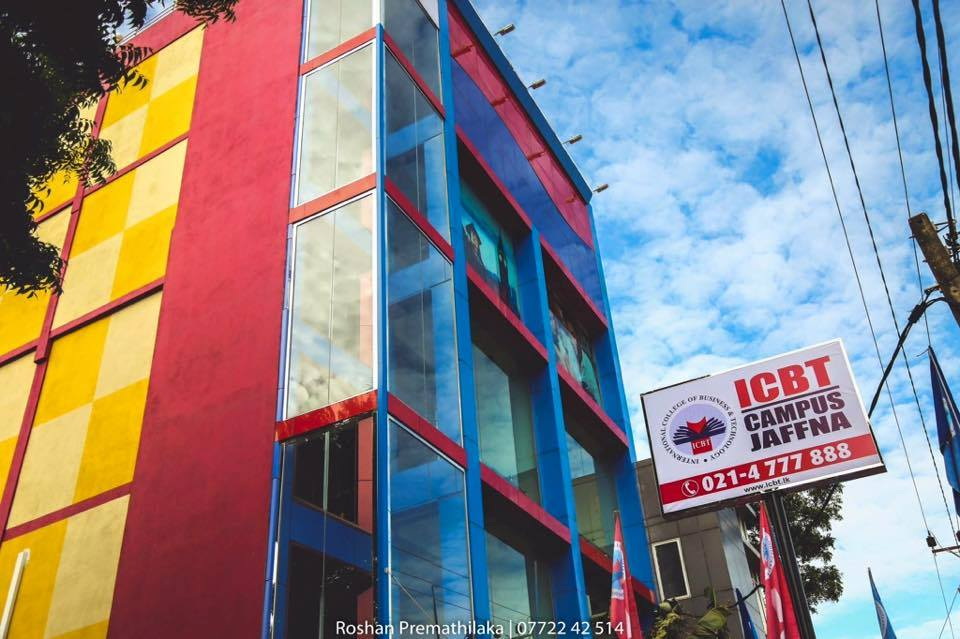
Jaffna branch of ICBT Campus

ICBT Campus has eight branches in Sri Lanka; the main campus is situated in Bambalapitiya, Colombo-04 with subsidiary branches in Gampaha, Nugegoda, Kurunegala, Kandy, Matara, Galle, Jaffna, Batticaloa and Anuradhapura.
