= Sangeetha Mohan (high jumper) =

Indian high jumper

Sport
- Country: India
- Sport: high jump
Medal record
Women's Athletics
Representing India
Asian Junior Athletics Championships
Bronze medal – third place	Ipoh 2004	high jump
South Asian Games
Gold medal – first place	Islamabad 2004	high jump

Sangeetha Mohan (born 2 April 1985) is a former Indian female high jumper. She has represented India at the 2004 Asian Junior Athletics Championships and 2004 South Asian Games. Sangeetha clinched gold medal in the women's high jump at the 2004 South Asian Games and in fact, set the women's high jump record of 1.81m at the South Asian Games history. She also secured a bronze medal in the women's high jump at the 2004 Asian Junior Athletics Championships held in Malaysia.

== See also ==
- List of South Asian Games records in athletics
