= Ushan Thiwanka =

Sri Lankan high jumper

Personal information
- Full name: Hetti Thanthrige Ushan Thiwanka Perera
- Born: 22 January 1998 (age 28) Ragama, Western Province, Sri Lanka
- Education: Maris Stella College, Negombo; Texas A & M University

Sport
- Event: high jump

Hetti Thanthrige Ushan Thiwanka Perera also simply known either as Ushan Thiwanka Perera or Ushan Perera (born 22 January 1998) is a Sri Lankan high jumper and a Sri Lankan national record holder in men's high jump as well as in men's indoor high jump. In 2021, he served as a private with the Sri Lanka Army and was affiliated with the Sri Lanka Army Service Corps.

== Biography ==
Thiwanka endured difficult childhood as both of his parents were affected by polio. He completed his primary and secondary education at the Maris Stella College, Negombo. He joined the Texas A & M University-Commerce to pursue his major on construction engineering after obtaining a scholarship in 2020. He initially joined the Great Arizona College in California prior to obtaining scholarship at Texas A& M University Commerce.

== Career ==
Ushan received support and guidance from former veteran Sri Lankan high jumper Nagalingam Ethirveerasingam who now lives in the US. Ethirveerasingam also arranged a short training programme for Ushan in California in 2017. In addition, Ethirveerasingam also predicted a bright future ahead for Ushan and encouraged him to pursue his higher studies in the US in order to continue athletics career. He also claimed a gold medal at the 2015 Asian Youth Championship in Qatar.

He became a Sri Lankan national champion in high jump for the first time during the 2018 National beating veteran high jumper Manjula Kumara to claim gold medal where he cleared height of 2.18m.

He was shortlisted to represent Sri Lanka at the 2018 Asian Games but his selection was officially rejected by the Indonesian organizers of Asian Games due to the national organization forgetting to enter their names on time.

On 21 February 2021, he broke the national record in indoor high jump clearing 2.25m during the Lone Star Conference 2021 event in Texas. On 27 March 2021, he broke the high jump national record which was previously held by veteran high jumper Manjula Kumara clearing 2.28m. He achieved the feat during the 2021 Texas Relays Championships while being attached with the Texas A & M University.

On 8 May 2021, he created both national record as well as South Asian record in high jump, clearing 2.30m at the 2021 Lone Star Conference Outdoor Track and Field Championships in Texas. After clearing a record 2.30m, he renewed his own personal record as well as the Sri Lankan national record. He also surpassed India's Sarvesh Anil Kushare South Asian record of 2.21m. With this achievement, he also edged closer to the Olympic qualification criteria of 2.33m and also moved to the Top 3 rankings among high jumpers at international level.
