= Maldives at the 2019 South Asian Games =

- IOC code: MDV
- NOC: Maldives

in Kathmandu and Pokhara, Nepal
- Competitors: 216 in 22 sports
- Flag bearer: Hawwa Raashidha
- Medals Ranked 6th: Gold 1 Silver 0 Bronze 4 Total 5

South Asian Games appearances (overview)
- 1984; 1985; 1987; 1989; 1991; 1993; 1995; 1999; 2004; 2006; 2010; 2016; 2019; 2025

Maldives competed in the 2019 South Asian Games in Kathmandu and Pokhara, Nepal from 1 to 10 December 2019.

== Medal tally ==
As of 10 December 2019

Rank	Nation	Gold	Silver	Bronze	Total
1	Maldives (MDV)	1	0	4	5
Totals (1 entries)		1	0	4	5
