= Vinoj Suranjaya =

Sri Lankan track and field athlete

Personal information
- Full name: Vinoj Suranjaya De Silva Muthumuni
- Born: 9 January 1995 (age 31) Balapitiya, Mahamodara, Southern Province

Sport
- Event: 200m
Medal record
Men's Athletics
Representing Sri Lanka
South Asian Games
Gold medal – first place	2016 Guwahati	200m
Gold medal – first place	2016 Guwahati	4×100m relay
Gold medal – first place	2019 Kathmandu	4×100m relay
Silver medal – second place	2019 Kathmandu	200m
Military World Games
Bronze medal – third place	2015 Mungyeong	4×100m relay

Vinoj Suranjaya De Silva Muthumuni (born 9 January 1995), also simply known as Vinoj De Silva or Vinoj Suranjaya, is a Sri Lankan track and field athlete and a national record holder in men's 200m.

== Career ==
He made his South Asian Games debut representing Sri Lanka at the 2016 South Asian Games and claimed two gold medals in 200m and 4 × 100 m relay events. In 2018 during the national trials for the 2018 Asian Games, he broke the 200m national record after 20 years which was held by former athlete Sugath Thilakaratne, clocking 20.68 seconds. He also represented Sri Lanka at the 2018 Commonwealth Games.

Vinoj also claimed silver in men's 200m event and was also part of the team which claimed new South Asian Games record for the men's 4 × 100 m relay event on 6 December 2019 during the 2019 South Asian Games.
