= Ghulam Abbas (hurdler) =

Pakistani hurdler (born 1966)

Personal information
- Nationality: Pakistani
- Born: 19 March 1966 Harappa

Sport
- Country: Pakistan
- Sport: Athletics
- Event: Hurdling
Medal record
Men's athletics
Representing Pakistan
Asian Games
Gold medal – first place	1990 Beijing	400 m hurdles
Asian Championships
Silver medal – second place	1991 Kuala Lumpur	400 m hurdles
South Asian Games
Gold medal – first place	1991 Colombo	400 m hurdles
Gold medal – first place	1989 Islamabad	400 m hurdles
Gold medal – first place	1991 Colombo	110 m hurdles
Gold medal – first place	1989 Islamabad	110 m hurdles
Bronze medal – third place	1993 Dhaka	400 m hurdles

Ghulam Abbas (born 19 March 1966, Harappa) is a Pakistani former hurdler who competed in the 1992 Summer Olympics and the 1991 World Championships in Athletics. He was the 1990 Asian Games 400 metres hurdles champion.

== Awards ==
Ribbon	Decoration	Country	Year
	Pride of Performance	Pakistan	1992

Ghulam Abbas was awarded the Pride of Performance Award in 1992 in recognition of his outstanding achievements and contributions to athletics.

== See also ==
- List of Pakistani records in athletics
- Athletics in Pakistan
- Pakistan at the Olympics
