= Suman Devi =

Indian athlete

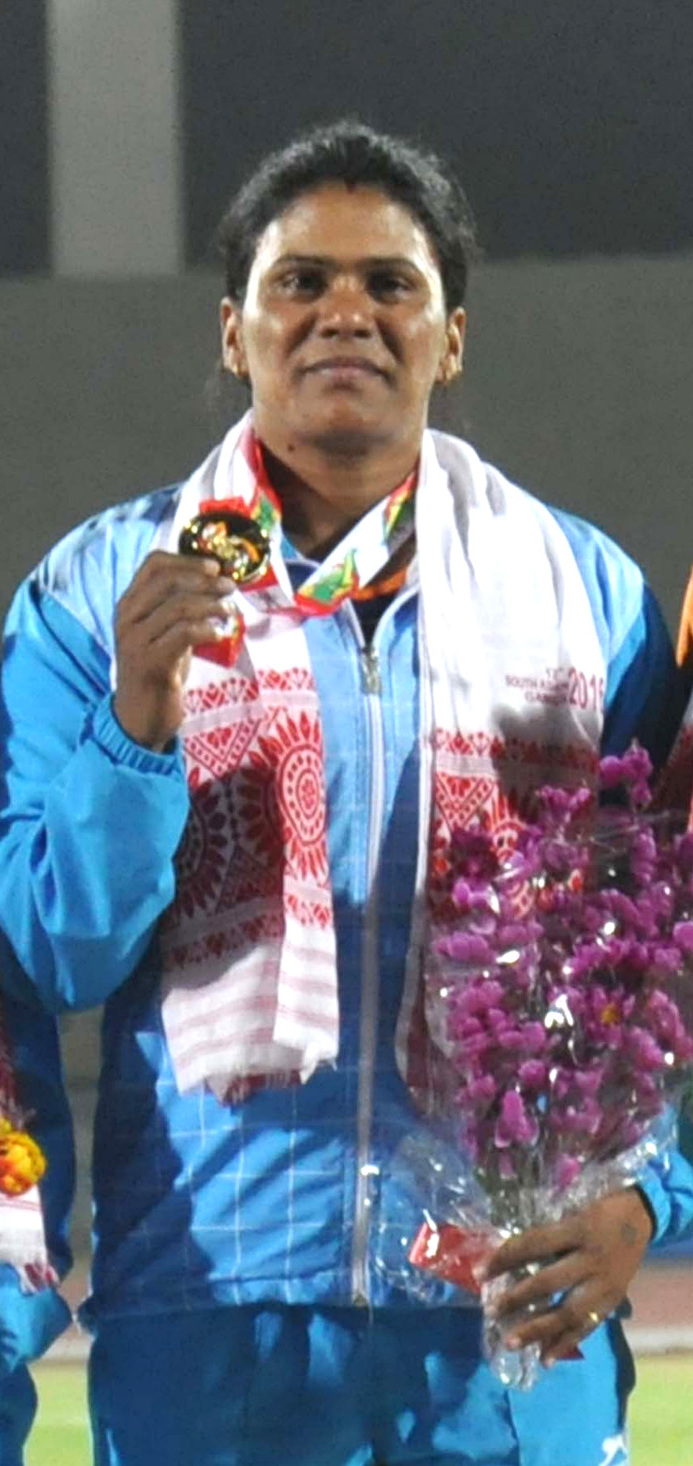
- Suman Devi at 12th South Asian Games 2016

Personal information
- Nationality: Indian
- Born: July 15, 1985 (age 40)
- Occupation(s): Track and field athlete
- Years active: 2000–2017

Sport
- Country: India
- Sport: Athletics
- Event: Javelin throw
- Retired: yes

Achievements and titles
- Regional finals: Asian Games competitor (2014)
- National finals: Multiple national-level medals
- Commonwealth finals: Competitor (2010)
- Personal best: 59.45 m

Suman Devi (born 15 July 1985) is an Indian former track and field athlete who competed in the javelin throw. She represented India at the 2010 Commonwealth Games and the 2014 Asian Games, and is a gold medalist from the 2016 South Asian Games. Her career personal best of 59.45 metres ranks her among the top Indian women in the event's history.

Suman competed in javelin throw at the national level from 2000 to 2006. She won a bronze at the 2003 SAF Games in Pakistan and a silver at the 2008 SAF Championships in Kochi. At the junior level, she won silver at the 2002 Junior Asian Championships in Bangkok.

In 2017, Devi tested positive for nandrolone, a prohibited anabolic steroid, during an out-of-competition test conducted by the National Anti-Doping Agency (NADA). In 2019, NADA imposed a four-year ban, applied retrospectively from 2017 to 2021. During her suspension, Devi underwent surgery for a stomach tumour.
