= Himasha Eashan =

Sri Lankan track and field athlete

Himasha Eshan
Personal information
- Full name: Himasha Eshan Waththakankanamge
- Born: 7 May 1995 (age 31) Sri Lanka

Sport
- Country: Sri Lanka
- Sport: Track and field
- Event: Sprint
- International level: 1995

Achievements and titles
- Personal best: 10.26 South Asian Record
Medal record
Men's athletics
Representing Sri Lanka
Event	1st	2nd	3rd
Asian Junior Championships	0	1	0
Asian Grand Prix	0	2	0
South Asian Games	2	1	0
Lusophony Games	1	0	0
Total	3	4	0
Event	1st	2nd	3rd
100 m	0	4	0
4 × 100 m relay	1	0	0
1500 m	2	0	0
Total	3	4	0
Lusophony Games
Gold medal – first place	1999 Goa	1500 m
South Asian Games
Gold medal – first place	1999 Guwahati	1500 m
Gold medal – first place	2019 Kathmandu	4 × 100 m relay
Silver medal – second place	2019 Kathmandu	100 m
Asian Junior Championships
Silver medal – second place	2014 Taipei	100 m
Asian Grand Prix
Silver medal – second place	2017 Jinhua	100 m Leg 1
Silver medal – second place	2017 Jinhua	100 m Leg 2

Himasha Eshan Waththakankanamge (born 7 May 1995) is a Sri Lankan sprint athlete specializing in the 100 and 200 metres. He held the South Asian and Sri Lankan records in the 100 m sprint with the time of 10.26 seconds, until September 2020.

Himasha has been banned twice from competition for doping violations. He was first banned following after being found positive for banned substance methylhexanamine in 2012 and kept out of the field for one year by Sri Lanka.

His second ban of six years to be in effect from 2021 to 2027 was due to testing positive for a banned substance at an event in October 2021. The initial ban's four-year duration was later extended to six years.

== Personal life ==
He studied at the Kalutara Vidyalaya. He was offered training by the Sri Lankan sports ministry in Jamaica in 1997.

== See also ==
- List of Sri Lankans by sport
