= 2019 South Asian Games =

XIII South Asian Games

XIII South Asian Games
- Host city: Kathmandu, Pokhara & Janakpur
- Country: Nepal
- Nations: 7
- Athletes: 2715
- Events: 317 in 26 sports
- Opening: 1 December
- Closing: 10 December
- Opened by: Bidhya Devi Bhandari (President of Nepal)
- Athlete's Oath: Paras Khadka (cricket)
- Judge's Oath: Deepak Thapa (badminton)
- Torch lighter: Deepak Bista
- Main venue: Dasarath Rangasala Stadium
- Website: www.13sagnepal.com

The 2019 South Asian Games, officially the XIII South Asian Games, was a major multi-sport event which was originally slated to be held from 9 to 18 March 2019 in Kathmandu and Pokhara, Nepal. However, the dates were postponed and the event was held from 1–10 December 2019, coincidentally at the same time as the 2019 Southeast Asian Games in the Philippines. The new dates were confirmed at the South Asian Olympic Council Executive Board meeting in Bangkok on 1 March 2019. The Dasarath Stadium hosted the opening ceremony along with the men's football tournament, with the stadium's renovation after the 2015 earthquake completed in under 10 months with an increased capacity of 20,000, along with the closing ceremony on 10 December.

== Venues ==
Three different cities in Nepal hosted the competition: Kathmandu, Pokhara and Janakpur.

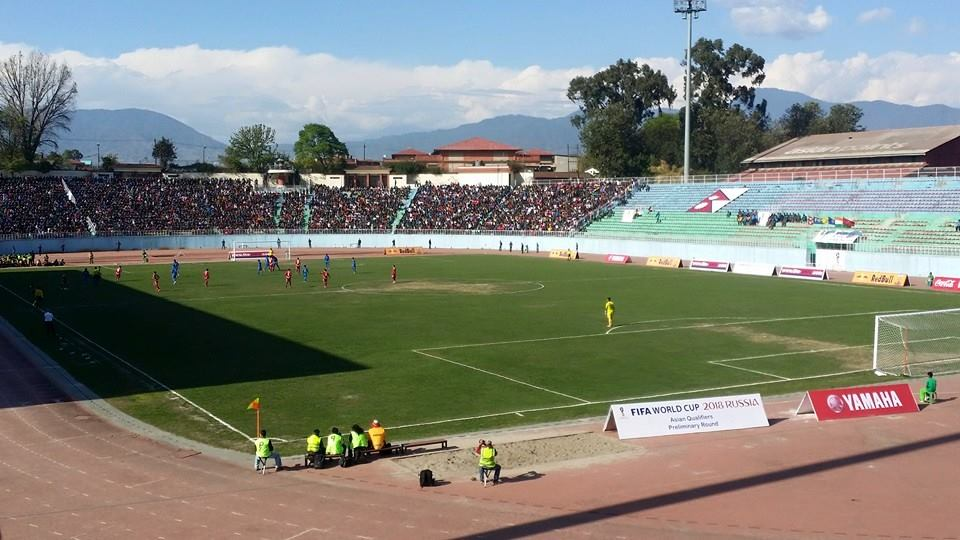
Dasarath Rangasala Stadium, Kathmandu

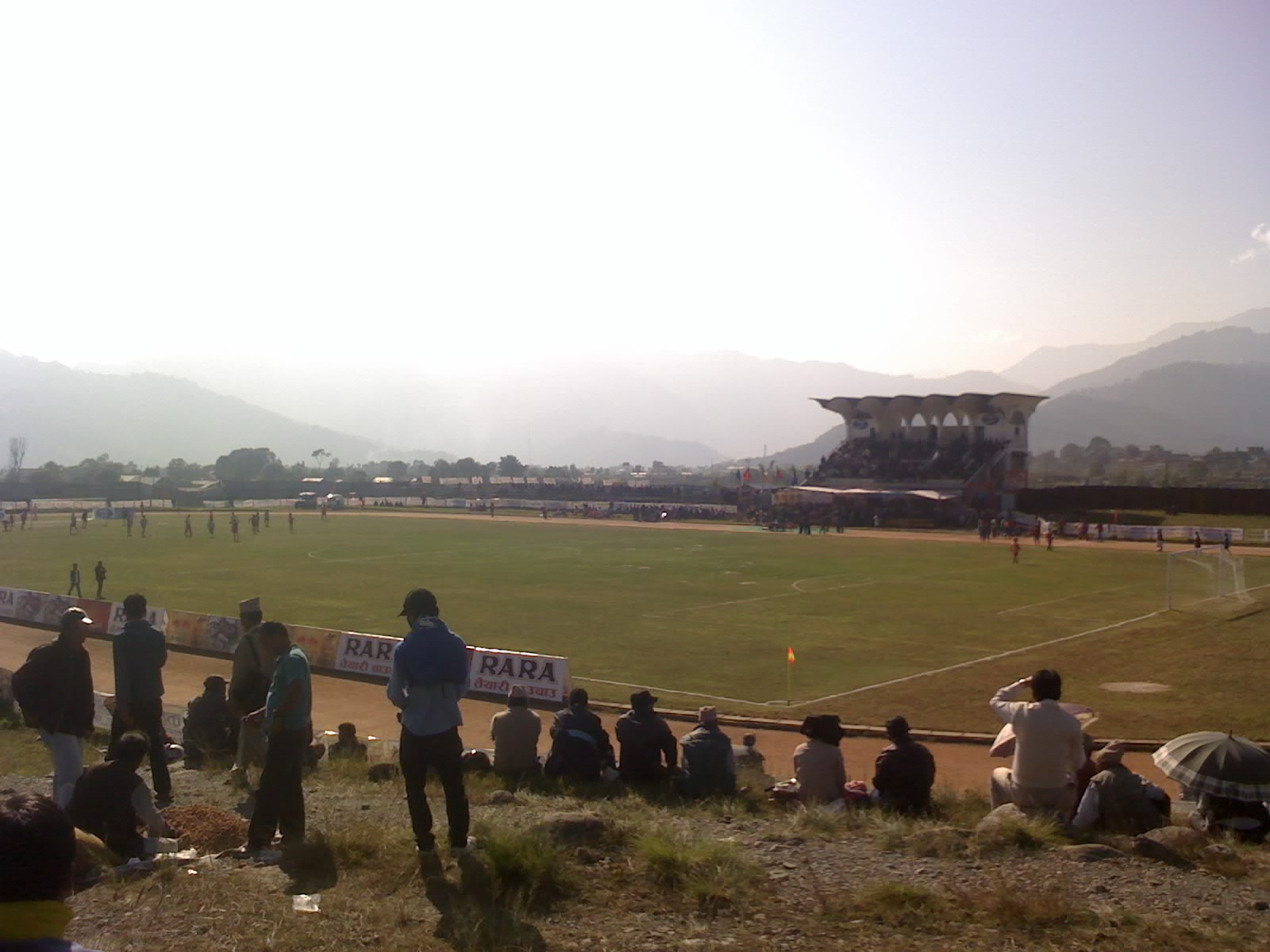
Pokhara Stadium

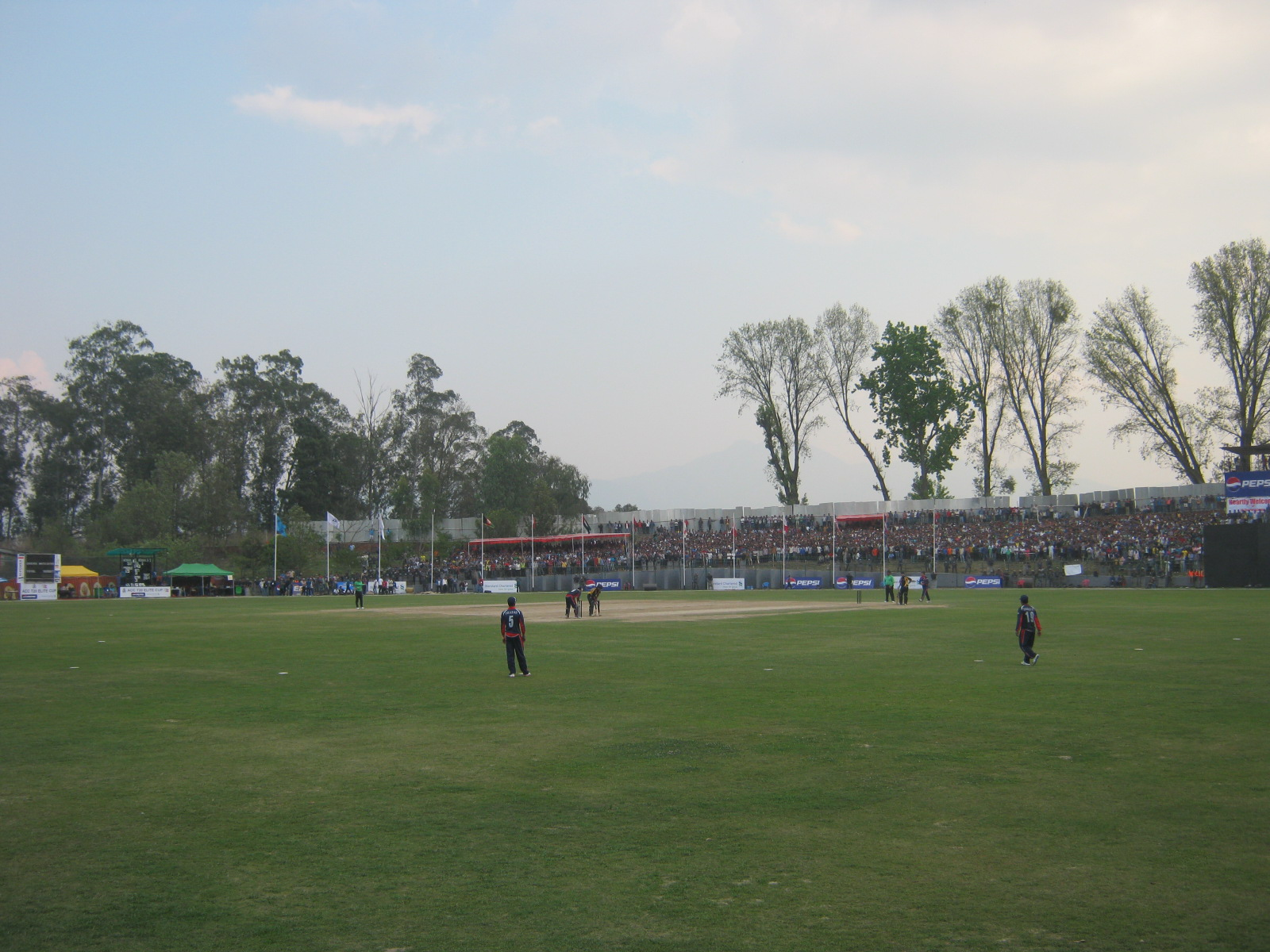
TU Cricket Ground

=== Kathmandu ===
Venue	Sport(s)
Dasarath Stadium	Athletics; Football (men)
International Sports Complex, Satdobato	Boxing; Karate; Shooting; Squash; Swimming; Taekwondo; Tennis
Covered Hall, Tripureshwor	Basketball; Volleyball
TU Cricket Ground	Cricket (men)
Sahid Park, Gokarna	Cycling (mountain biking)
Ring Road	Cycling (road)
Covered Hall, Naya Bazar, Kirtipur	Fencing; Kho-kho
Gokarna Forest Resort	Golf
Army Physical Fitness Centre, Lagankhel	Judo; Wushu
APF Hall, Halchowk	Kabaddi
Table Tennis Hall, Lainchaur	Table Tennis

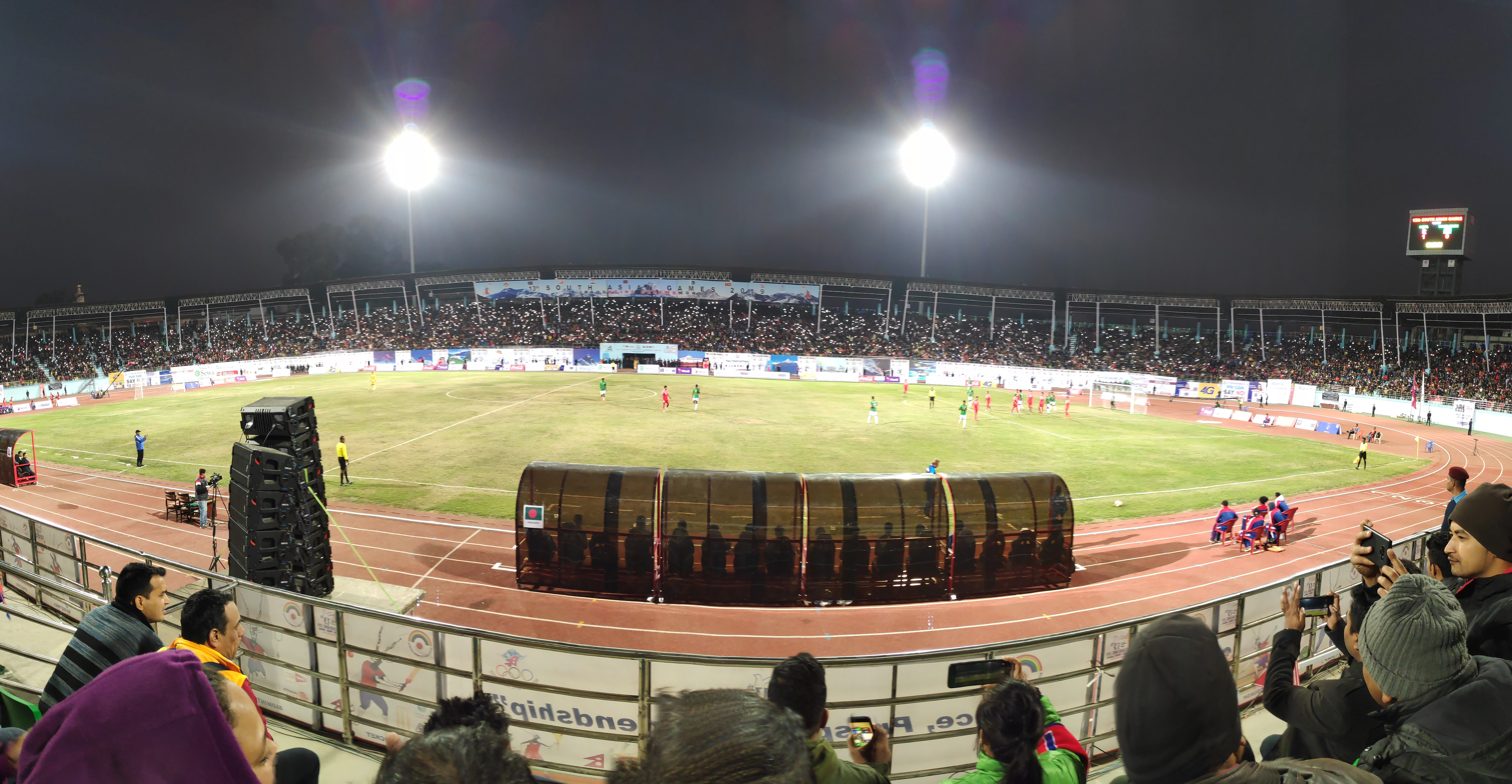
Nepal vs Bangladesh SAG 2019 Group Stage Match. Nepal with 1 – 0 score.

Location of events in 2019 South Asian Games in Nepal

=== Pokhara ===
Venue	Sport(s)
Badminton Covered Hall, Pokhara	Badminton
Pokhara Cricket Ground	Cricket (women)
Pokhara Stadium	Archery; Football (women)
Pokhara Covered Hall	Handball
Basundhara Park	Triathlon
Phewa Lake	Beach volleyball
Matepani	Weightlifting

=== Janakpur ===
Venue	Sport(s)
Janakpur Covered Hall	Wrestling

== Logo and mascot ==
On 13 May 2019, the Ministry of Youth and Sports of Nepal unveiled the logo and mascot of the 13th South Asian Games. The ministry along with the Nepal Olympic Committee revealed a pair of blackbucks (Krishnashar) as the official mascot for the 2019 South Asian Games. Blackbucks are the only extant member of the genus Antelope and mostly found in the southern region of Nepal and is an endangered species with in Nepal.

The committee also revealed the official logo of the Games, a flying pigeon that embodies the vibrant colour of the logo of South Asia Olympic Council. It also includes world heritage sites and mountains of Nepal in the background.

== The Games ==
=== Participating nations ===
Seven countries competed. For the first time since 1999, Afghanistan did not compete at the South Asian Games, after leaving the South Asia Olympic Council in 2016. A total of 2,715 athletes competed.

- Bangladesh (470 athletes)
- Bhutan (116)
- India (487)
- Maldives (216)
- Nepal (596)
- Pakistan (263)
- Sri Lanka (564)

=== Sports ===
These Games featured 26 sports with cricket returning after 8 years. Golf and karate were the two sports added by the hosts as their choice. All events must include a minimum of four participating teams otherwise it will not be held. Paragliding, which was scheduled to debut, was removed, as only two nations (Nepal and Pakistan) had registered competitors.

- Archery (10)
- Athletics (36)
- Badminton (7)
- Basketball (4)
- Boxing (16)
- Cricket (2)
- Cycling
  - Mountain biking (4)
  - Road (4)
- Fencing (12)
- Football (2)
- Golf (4)
- Handball (2)
- Judo (15)
- Kabaddi (2)
- Karate (19)
- Kho kho (2)
- Shooting (11)
- Squash (4)
- Swimming (38)
- Table tennis (7)
- Taekwondo (29)
- Tennis (7)
- Triathlon
  - Duathlon (2)
  - Triathlon (3)
- Volleyball
  - Beach volleyball (2)
  - Volleyball (2)
- Weightlifting (20)
- Wrestling (20)
- Wushu (22)

=== Calendar ===
This is currently based on the schedule released by the South Asia Olympic Council prior to the 13th South Asian Games (2019 Nepal).

All dates are Nepal Time (UTC+5:45)

OC	Opening ceremony	●	Event competitions	1	Event finals	CC	Closing ceremony

November/December, 2019		27 Wed	28 Thu	29 Fri	30 Sat	1 Sun	2 Mon	3 Tue	4 Wed	5 Thu	6 Fri	7 Sat	8 Sun	9 Mon	10 Tue	Gold medals
Ceremonies						OC									CC	
Archery										●	●	4	4	2		10
Athletics								4	10	4	8	6	4			36
Basketball	Basketball									●	●	●	●	●	2	4
Basketball	3x3 Basketball											●	●	2		4
Badminton						●	2	●	●	●	5					7
Boxing											●	●	●	6	10	16
Cricket	Cricket (M)							●	●	●	●	●	●	1		2
Cricket	Cricket (F)							●	●	●	●	●	1			2
Cycling									2	2	2	2				8
Fencing											3	3	3	3		12
Football	Football (M)							●	●	●	●	●	●	●	1	2
Football	Football (F)							●	●	●	●	●	●	1		2
Golf								●	●	●	4					4
Handball										●	●	●	●	2		2
Judo													7	7	6	20
Kabaddi									●	●	●	●	●	2		2
Karate							9	6	4							19
Kho-Kho								●	2							2
Shooting								1	2	1	2	1	1	1		9
Squash											●	●	2	●	2	4
Swimming						8	7	7	8	8						38
Table tennis							●	2	3	●	2					7
Taekwondo							13	4	6	6						29
Tennis							●	●	2	2	●	●	●	3	2	9
Triathlon							2	1	2							5
Volleyball	Beach volleyball										●	●	●	2		4
Volleyball	Volleyball	●	●	●	●	●	●	2								4
Weightlifting										5	5	5	5			20
Wrestling											4	4	4	2		14
Wushu								2	2	19						23
Total gold medals						8	33	29	43	47	35	25	31	34	23	308
Cumulative Total						8	41	70	113	160	195	220	251	285	308	308

== Records ==
1. On 2 December 2019, Nepal women cricketer Anjali Chand created history by registering best bowling figures in any international Twenty20 match. She took 6 wickets for 0 runs while playing against Maldives.
2. On 3 December 2019, Indian shooter Mehuli Ghosh clinched the 10m air rifle gold with a score of 253.3 in the final. Though her score, which is 0.4 more than the current world record of 252.9, created by another Indian shooter Apurvi Chandela is not recognised by the international body ISSF but is the Games record.
3. Indian high jumper Sarvesh Anil Kushare created Games record in the final of the high jump event. He jumped a height of 2.21 meter breaking 2.20 meters set by Sri Lankan athlete Manjula Kumara at the 2004 edition.
4. On 5 December 2019, Karthik Unnikrishnan of India broke the previous Games' Triple jump record of 16.45 metres set by Indian Renjith Maheshwary in the previous edition. He jumped a distance of 16.47 metres to win the gold medal.
5. On 6 December 2019, 2018 Asian Games champion, Tejinder Pal Singh set a new Games record in Shot put. He threw the shot at a distance of 20.03 metres breaking previous record of 19.15 metres set by another Indian athlete Bahadur Singh Sagoo in the 1999 edition. On the same day, Sri Lankan men's 4x100 m relay team consisting of Himasha Eashan, Chanuka Sandeepa, Vinoj De Silva, Yupun Priyadarshana, set a new Games record, timing 39.14 secs bettering 39.91 secs previously set by Indian team in the 2004 edition.
6. On 7 December 2019, Pakistani athlete Arshad Nadeem created a new Games record in Javelin throw. He threw a distance of 86.23 metres bettering previous distance of 83.23 metres by India.

== Medal table ==
As of 13 July 2021 (After the Doping Results)

Rank	Nation	Gold	Silver	Bronze	Total
1	India (IND)	175	92	45	312
2	Nepal (NEP)*	51	60	96	207
3	Sri Lanka (SRI)	40	84	128	252
4	Pakistan (PAK)	30	41	57	128
5	Bangladesh (BAN)	19	32	89	140
6	Maldives (MDV)	1	0	4	5
7	Bhutan (BHU)	0	7	13	20
Totals (7 entries)		316	316	432	1,064

== Broadcasting rights ==
Organizer of 2019 South Asian Games, Nepal Olympic Committee (NOC), sold the broadcast rights to A company, NK Media Ventures Pvt Ltd who ensured that the event will be available live in more than 15 channels across South Asia. In Nepal, following channel purchased broadcasting rights from NK Media Ventures.

- Nepal Television
- AP1 TV
- Action Sports channel

== Doping at the 2019 South Asian Games ==
150 random athletes participating in SAG 2019 were tested for Prohibited substances and the test samples were sent to WADA (World Anti-Doping Agency)- accredited laboratory in Qatar by SAG Anti Doping Organizing Committee. 3 Athletes had failed the Doping Test. They appealed against the result of the test; they were given another chance to get a fair test and were called off with B-samples. The test held in the same laboratory and they had failed the test again. They were banned for four years until 2 December 2023.

"As per the international norms of athletics, the trio will be stripped of their medals and the athletes finishing just behind them will be given their medals," said RK Bista, International Technical Officers of Athletes.

Name	NOC	Sport	Banned Substance	Stripped off Medals	Awarded
Mehboob Ali	Pakistan	Athletics	Anabolic Androgenic Steroids	(gold) (Men's 400 m Hurdles)	(India) Jabir Madari Pa
Mehboob Ali	Pakistan	Athletics	Anabolic Androgenic Steroids	(bronze) (Men's 4×400 m Relay)	(Bangladesh) MD Abu Taleb (Bangladesh) MD Masud Rana (Bangladesh) MD Saiful Ismail (Bangladesh) MD Jahir
Muhammad Naeem	Pakistan	Athletics	Anabolic Androgenic Steroids	(gold) (Men's 110 m Hurdles)	(India) Surendhar Jayak
Sami Ullah	Pakistan	Athletics	Anabolic Androgenic Steroids	(bronze) (Men's 100 m Sprint)	(Pakistan) Uzair Rehman
Sami Ullah	Pakistan	Athletics	Anabolic Androgenic Steroids	(bronze) (Men's 4×100 m Relay)	(Bangladesh) Abdur Rouf (Bangladesh) MD Ismail (Bangladesh) Shariful (Bangladesh) MD Hasan
