= List of fencers =

== Fencers and coaches of the Olympic era ==
Austria

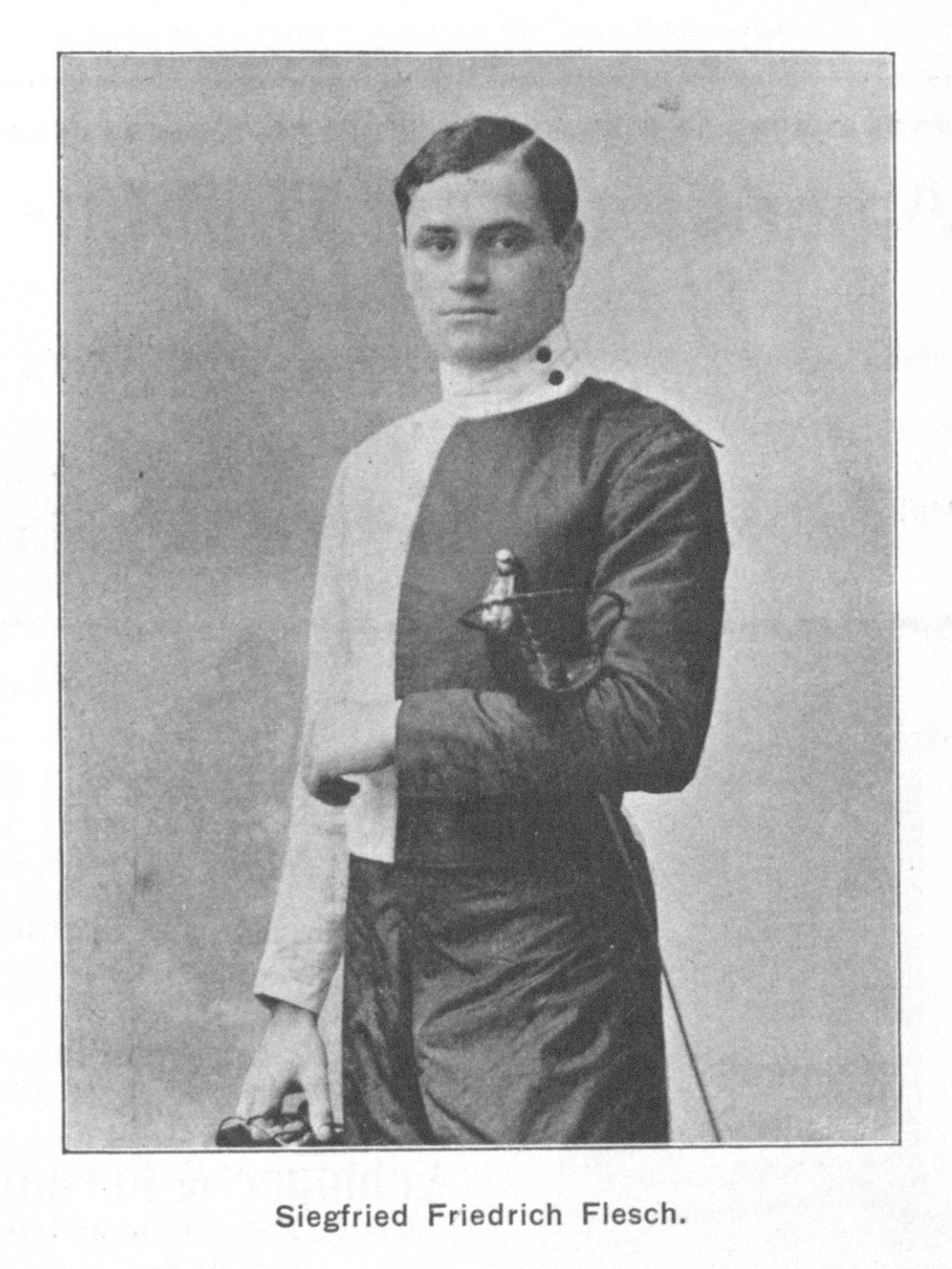
Siegfried Flesch

- Albert Bogen (Albert Bógathy), sabreur, Olympic silver
- Siegfried "Fritz" Flesch, sabreur and Olympic bronze medalist
- Otto Herschmann, sabreur; one of only a few athletes to have won Olympic medals in different sports; won silver medal in sabre team competition in 1912
- Ellen Preis, fencer (foil), Olympic champion, 3× world champion, 17× Austrian champion

Belarus

- Alexandr Romankov, foil fencer
- Viktor Sidjak, Olympic (1972) and World (1969) Champion, winner of the 1972 and 1973 World Cup, also member of the winning team at 1968, 1976, and 1980 Olympics and at 1969, 1970, 1971, 1974, 1975, and 1979 World Team Championships; pupil of David Tyshler
- Aliaksandr Buikevich, sabre fencer

Belgium

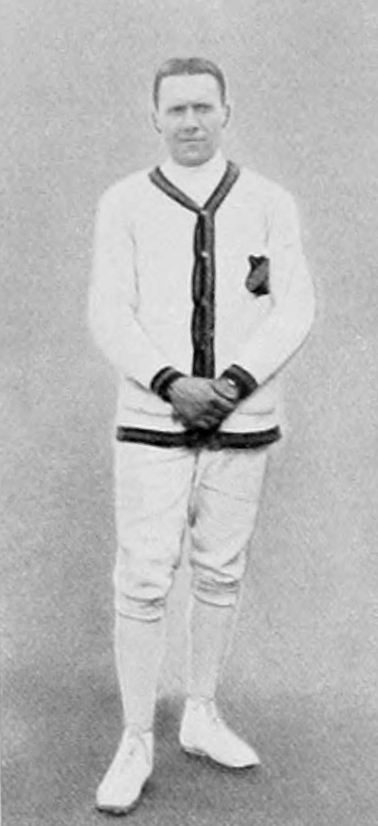
Paul Anspach

- Henri Anspach, fencer (épée and foil), Olympic champion
- Paul Anspach, fencer (épée and foil), 2x Olympic champion
- Jacques Ochs, fencer (épée), Olympic champion
- Gaston Salmon, fencer (épée), Olympic champion

Brazil

- Renzo Agresta, Brazilian fencer in individual sabre events at 2004, 2008 and 2012 Olympics
- Roberto Lazzarini, Brazilian fencer at the 1988 and 1992 Olympics
- Élora Pattaro, Brazilian fencer in women's individual sabre event at 2004 Olympics
- Fernando Scavasin, Brazilian fencer in the foil events at the 2016 Olympics

Bulgaria

- Vasil Etropolski (born 1959), sabre, world champion and Olympic fencer

China

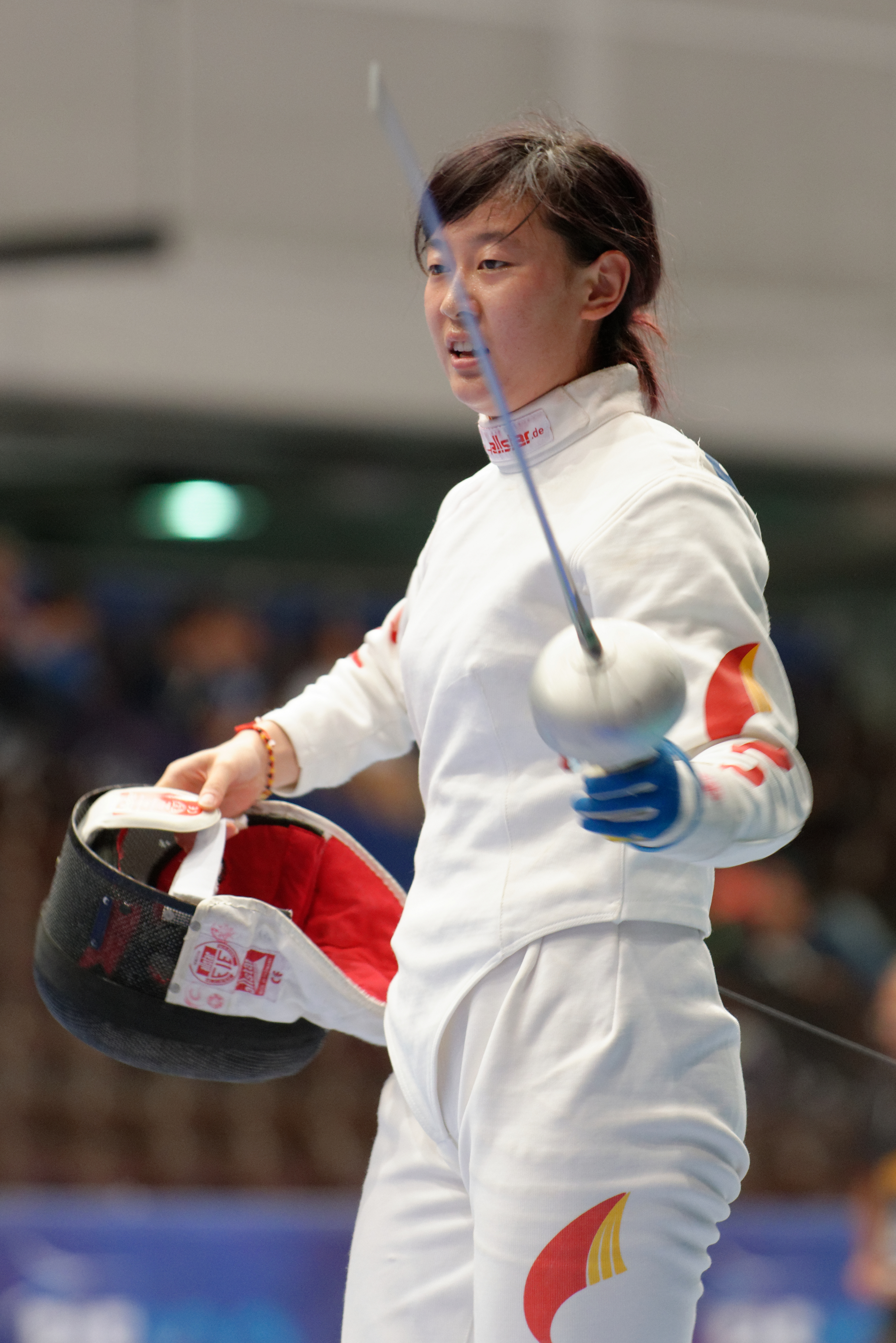
Sun Yiwen

- Jin Jing, wheelchair fencer who became a national celebrity following an incident during the 2008 Summer Olympics torch relay
- Wang Lei, Olympic Men's Individual Épée silver Medal 2004
- Ju-Jie Luan, fencer and coach, gold medalist for Women's Foil at 1984 Summer Olympics
- Zhong Man, 2008 Olympic Men's Individual Sabre Champion
- Sun Yiwen, Olympic women's epee champion

Denmark

- Ellen Osiier, Denmark foil fencer, Olympic champion
- Dr. Ivan Osiier, represented Denmark in seven Olympic Games between 1908 and 1948. Won the silver medal at the 1912 Summer Olympics, 25× Danish champion.

Estonia

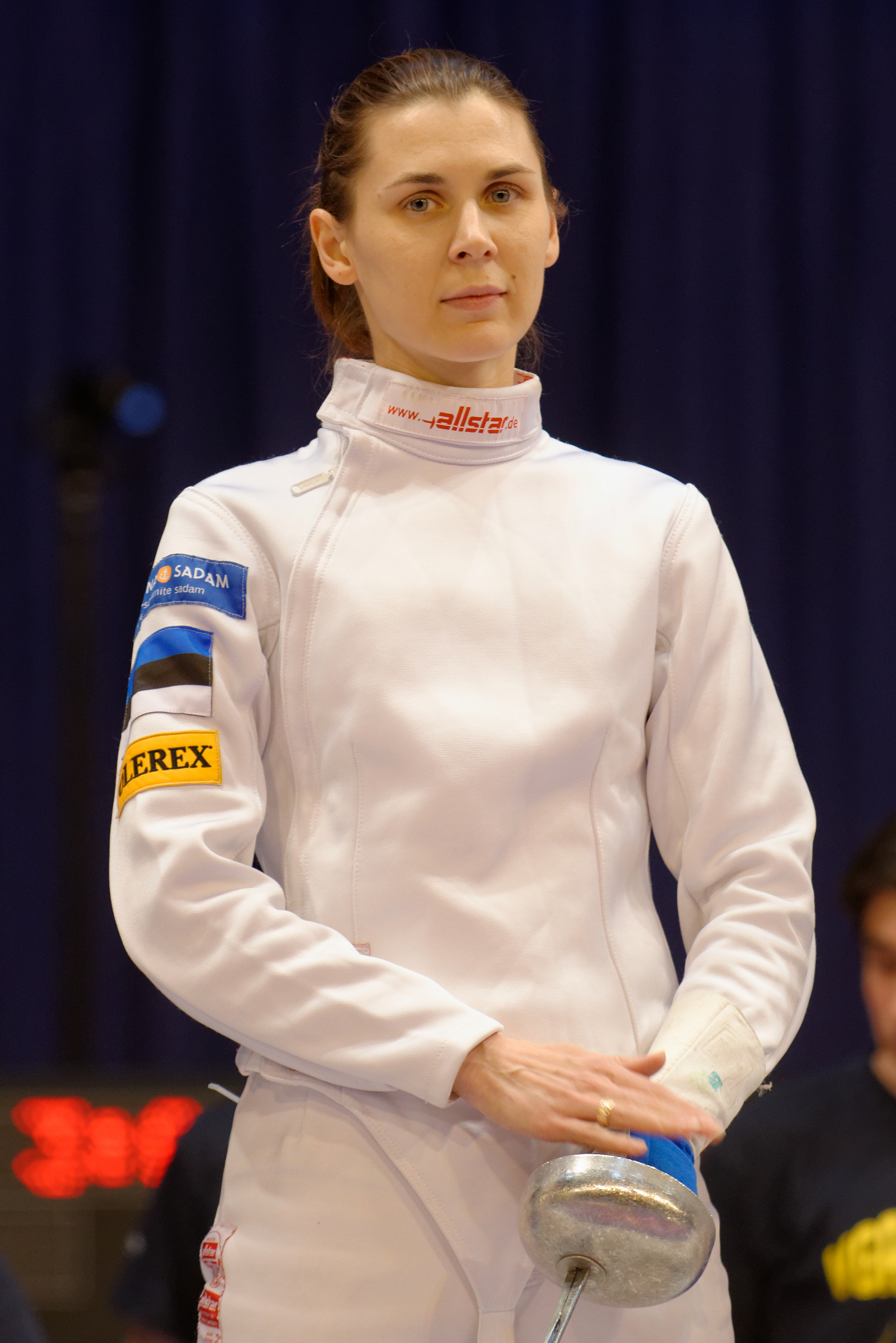
Irina Embrich

- Julia Beljajeva, épéeist, World Champion in Individual Women's Épée (2013). European Champion in Team Women's Épée (2013).
- Svetlana Chirkova-Lozovaja, most-successful Estonian fencer of the Soviet era. Olympic gold medal for Women's Foil team event at 1968 Summer Olympics, World champion in Women's Foil team event at 1971, silver 1969, individual World Championships bronze medal 1969.
- Irina Embrich, épéeist, silver (2002) at World Championships women's team event, bronze (2003) at European Championships women's team event, silver (2006) at World Championships women's individual event, bronze (2007) at World Championships and European Championships women's individual event. European Champion in Team Women's Épée (2013).
- Sven Järve, épéeist, bronze in Individual Men's Épée (2006).
- Kaido Kaaberma, épéeist, bronze (1990) and gold (1991) at World Championships team event (as a part of the Soviet team). Individual World Championships bronze (1999). Team World Championships silver (2001).
- Nikolai Novosjolov, épéeist, 2x World Champion in Individual Men's Épée (2010, 2013). Team World Championships silver (2001). European Championships silver (2012).

Finland

- Marianne Sjöblom, competed in the 1952 Summer Olympics.
- Nils Sjöblom, competed at the 1948 and 1952 Summer Olympics.

France

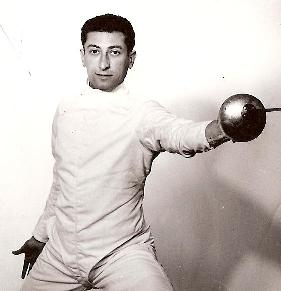
Yves Dreyfus

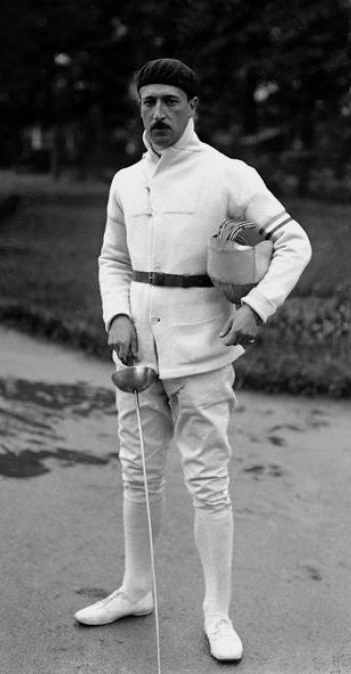
Alexandre Lippmann

- Romain Cannone, fencer (epee), Olympic champion
- Marc Cerboni, fencer (foil), won bronze medal at the 1984 Los Angeles Olympics .
- Yves Dreyfus, fencer (épée), national champion and 2x Olympic bronze medalist
- Lucien Gaudin, twice World Champion (1905 and 1918), won four gold and three silver Olympic medals covering all three weapons
- Laura Flessel-Colovic, épéeist with two gold, a silver and two bronze medals
- Alexandre Lippmann, fencer (épée), Olympic champion, 2× silver, bronze
- Armand Mouyal, fencer (épée), Olympic bronze, world champion, national champion
- Claude Netter, fencer (foil), Olympic champion, silver
- Christian d'Oriola, Olympic and world campion, named "Fencer of the 20th Century" by the FIE, International Fencing Federation, in 2001. Between 1947 and 1956 won four World Championships and six Olympic Medals, including two individual gold (foil), one individual silver (foil), two team gold (foil), and one team silver (foil). In addition to 4x Individual World Champion, 4x team world champion.
- Jean Stern, fencer (épée), Olympic champion

Georgia

- Sandro Bazadze, sabre, world championship bronze, 2x European champion

Germany

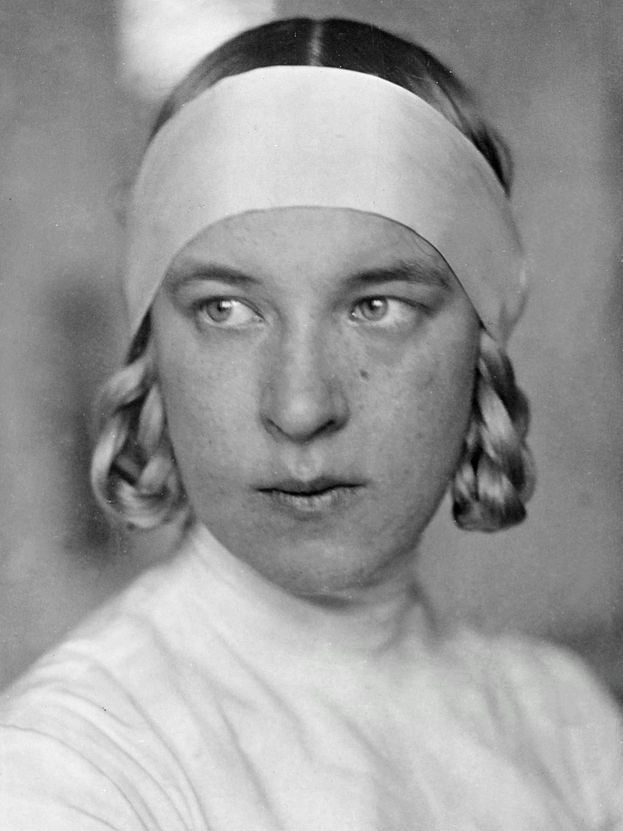
Helene Mayer

- Helene Mayer, German-Jewish foilist, won gold at 1928 Summer Olympics and the 1929 World Championship, left for US in 1931, returned to represent Germany in 1936 Summer Olympics and won silver, went back to US and was granted US citizenship, returned to Germany in 1952 and died of cancer in 1953, won the US Championships eight times.

Great Britain

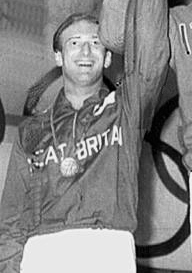
Allan Jay

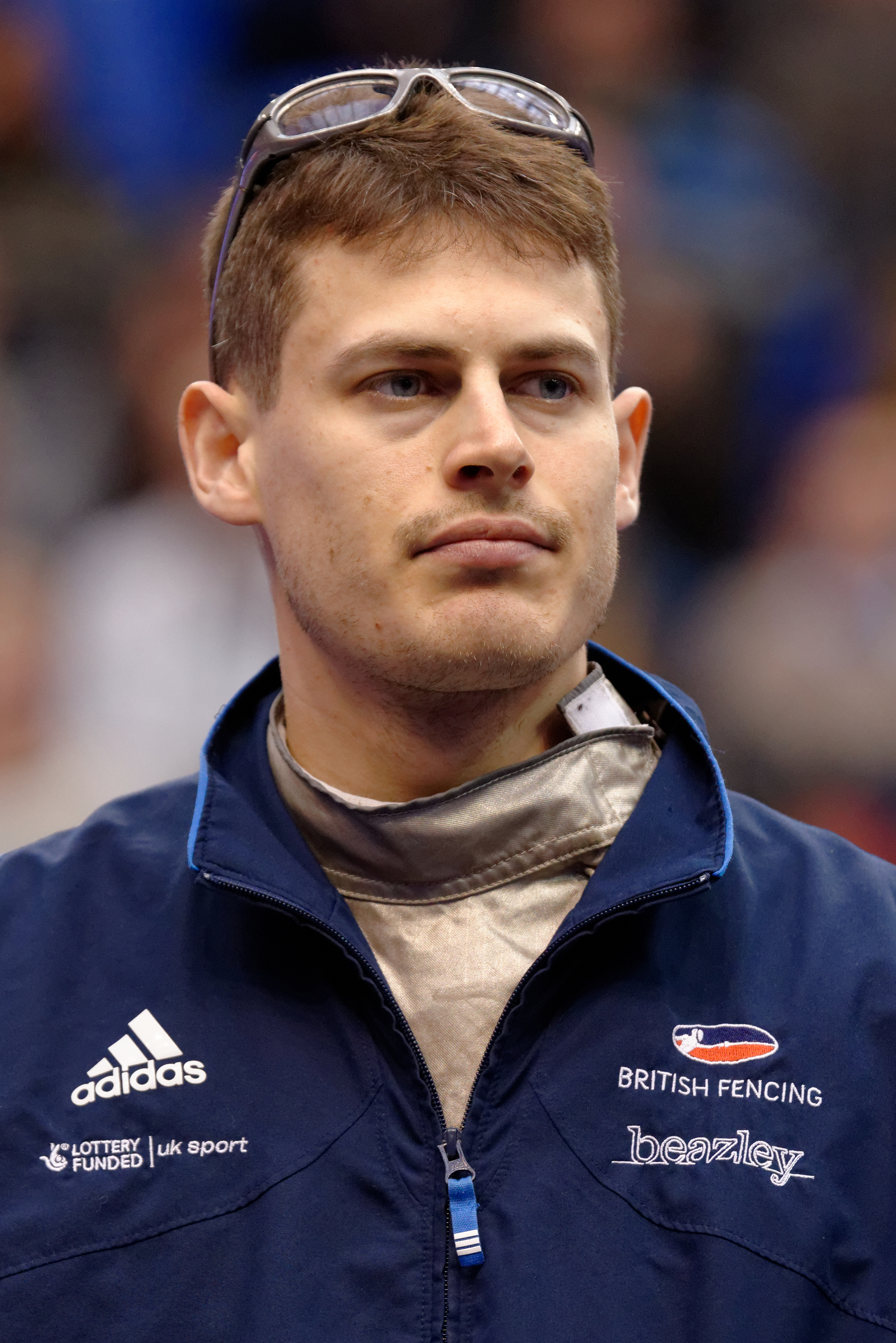
Richard Kruse

- Connie Adam, fencer, took up fencing aged 60 and went on to win 140 medals.
- Bob Anderson, sabre fencer, represented Great Britain at the Olympics and World Championships. Went on to a career as sword master and fight director for movies, including the Lord of the Rings trilogy, the Star Wars trilogy, and The Princess Bride. Coached Britain's national fencing team for 20 years.
- Robert Bruniges, World Junior Foil Champion 1976, 3x Olympian
- Richard Cohen, 5x British sabre champion, author of By the Sword, on the history of fencing
- Mary Glen Haig, 4x Olympian; IOC member
- Bill Hoskyns, 1958 World Épée Champion, 1960 Olympic Team silver medalist and 1964 Individual silver medalist. Fenced in the Olympics a record six times (1956–1976), twice at all three weapons. Eight times British champion, won four Commonwealth gold medals and one silver at different weapons.
- Allan Jay, Épée and foil fencer; Olympic 2× silver, world champion, 4x national champion
- Ralph Johnson, Epeeist, 4x Olympian, Commonwealth Games Épée Team Champion 1970, 6x British Épée champion,. Also British Under-20 Foil Champion 1967 and British Junior Foil Champion 1971
- Richard Kruse, Foil, reached quarter-finals at the 2004 Summer Olympics, won silver in Men's Foil at 2006 European Championships. First British fencer to achieve the world's top ranking.
- Fiona McIntosh, 4x British foil champion, winner of the 1990 Commonwealth Fencing Championships and 12 Commonwealth medals, 4x Olympian and finalist in Barcelona 1992
- Barry Paul, Foil, 3x Olympian, 5x British national champion, Managing Director of the only manufacturer of fencing equipment in the UK
- Raymond Paul, 2x Commonwealth Games gold medalist
- René Paul, competed at four Olympics and won 10 Commonwealth Games medals
- Edgar Seligman, won British championship twice in each weapon, twice won Olympic silver (épée)
- James Williams, sabreur, reached L16 at the 2000 Summer Olympics

Hungary

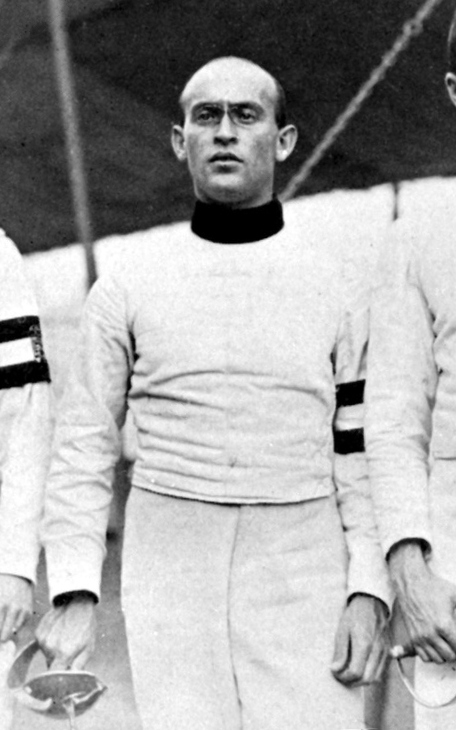
Jenő Fuchs

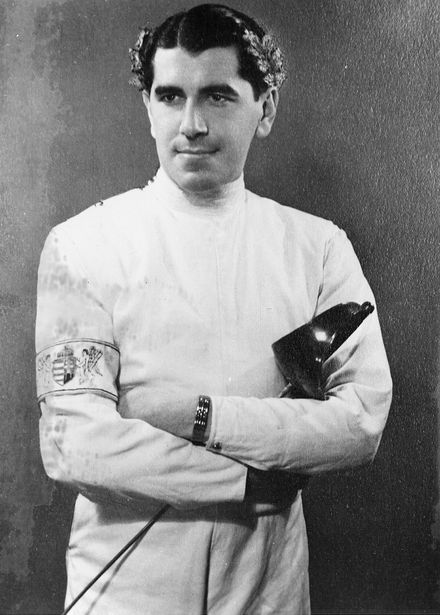
Endre Kabos

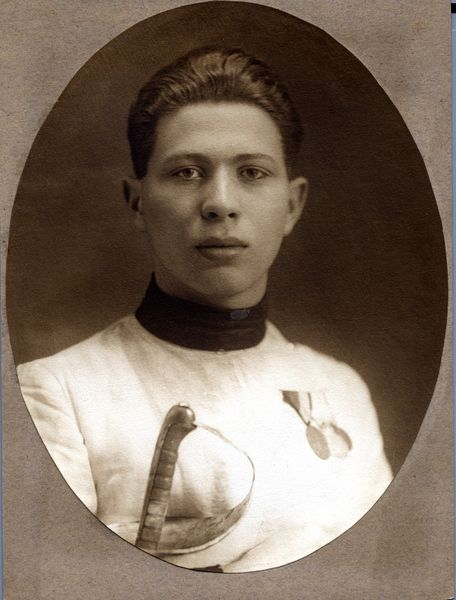
Attila Petschauer

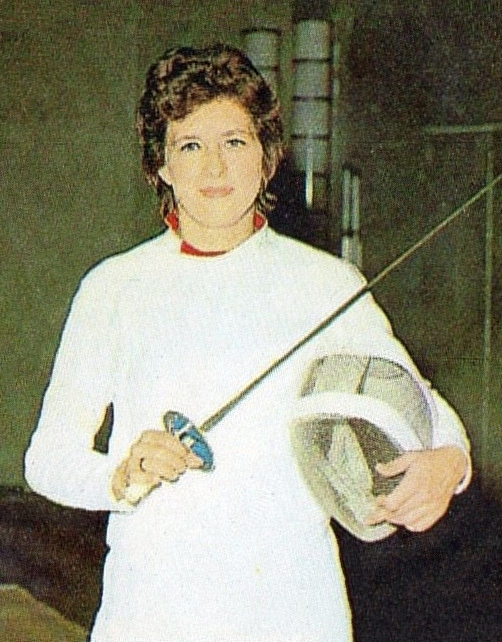
Ildikó Újlaky-Rejtő

- Péter Bakonyi (born (Buchwald)), Hungarian sabre fencer, 3x Olympic bronze, one World Championship gold medal
- László Borsody, fencing master
- Ilona Elek-Schacherer, Hungarian fencer (foil), 2x Olympic champion
- Sándor Erdös, fencer (épée), Olympic champion
- Dezső Földes, fencer (sabre), 2x Olympic champion
- Jenő Fuchs, fencer (sabre), 4x Olympic champion
- Tamás Gábor, fencer (épée), Olympic champion
- János Garay, fencer (sabre), Olympic champion
- Oskar Gerde, fencer (sabre), 2x Olympic champion
- Aladár Gerevich, sabreur; only athlete to win the same Olympic event six times.
- Pál Gerevich, sabreur; son of Aladár Gerevich; Individual Sabre World champion (1977), 4x Team Sabre World champion (1973, 1978, 1981, 1982); "Hungarian Sportsman of the Year" (1977)
- Sándor Gombos, fencer (sabre), Olympic champion
- Endre Kabos, fencer (sabre), 3x Olympic champion, bronze
- Rudolf Kárpáti, 6x Olympic and 7x world sabre champion
- Pál Kovács, fencer (sabre), 6x Olympic champion
- Daniel Magay, fencer (sabre), Olympic champion
- Ferenc Marki, fencing master
- Tímea Nagy, fencer (épée), twice Olympic champion
- Attila Petschauer, fencer (sabre), 2x Olympic champion
- György Piller, fencer, Olympic champion and coach, fencing master
- Zoltan Ozoray Schenker, fencer (sabre and foil), Olympic champion, silver, and bronze
- Bence Szabó, fencer (sabre), 2x Olympic champion
- László Szabó, master; defined a system for developing coaches and wrote "Fencing and the Master"; the only direct student of the legendary Italo Santelli to write of what he learned. Teacher of Olympic and World champions.
- Emese Szász-Kovács fencer (epee), Olympic champion
- Istvan Szelei, fencer (foil), 1980 and 1988 Olympic Squads.
- Áron Szilágyi, fencer (sabre), 3x Olympic champion
- Ildikó Újlaky-Rejtő, fencer (foil), 2x Olympic champion
- Lajos Werkner, fencer (sabre), 2x Olympic champion

Hong Kong

- Cheng Ka Long, fencer (foil), 2021 and 2024 Olympic champion
- Vivian Kong, fencer (epee), 2024 Olympic champion

India

- Bhavani Devi, fencer (sabre), 2018 and 2022 Commonwealth Fencing Championship gold medalist.
- Karan Singh Gurjar, fencer (sabre)
- Taniksha Khatri, fencer (epee)

Israel

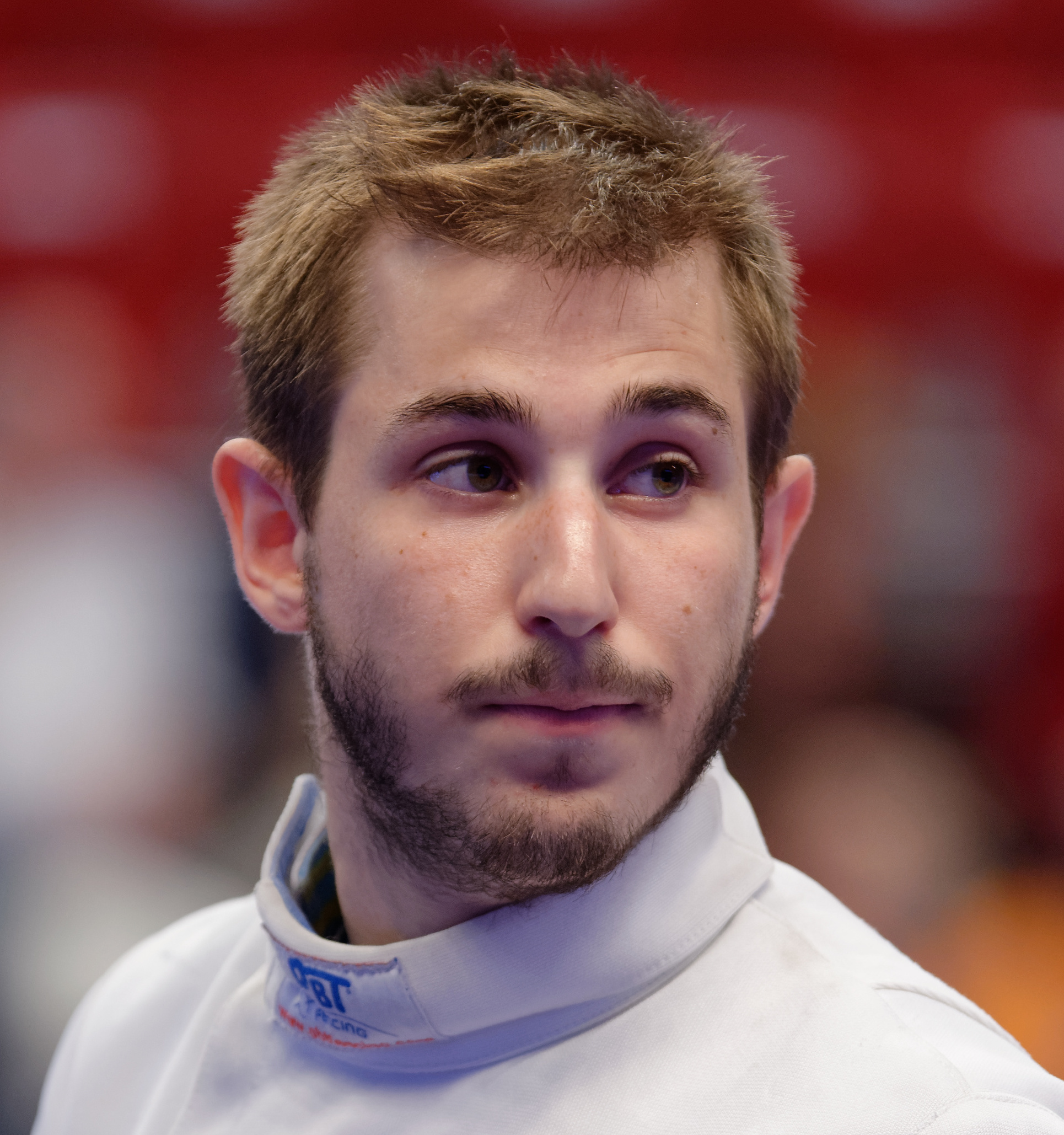
Yuval Freilich

- Boaz Ellis, 5x Jewish Israeli national foil champion, and 3x NCAA champion
- Yuval Freilich (born 1995), European epee champion
- Lydia Hatuel-Czuckermann, Israeli fencer (foil), 16x Israeli national champion – Guinness Record, took part at three Olympic Games – Los Angeles 1984, Barcelona 1992, Atlanta 1996.
- Noam Mills, Israel (épée), female junior world champion
- Ayelet Ohayon, Israeli fencer (foil), European champion
- Andre Spitzer (1945–September 6, 1972), Jewish Israeli fencing master and coach of Israel's 1972 Summer Olympics team. One of 11 athletes and coaches taken hostage and subsequently murdered by Palestinian terrorists in the Munich massacre.

Italy

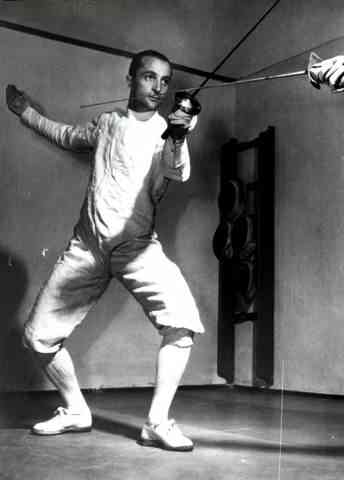
Edoardo Mangiarotti

- Luigi Barbasetti, fencing master and reformer
- Daniele Garozzo, Olympic foil champion
- Edoardo Mangiarotti, won more Olympic titles and World championships than any other fencer in the history of the sport; a member of the Mangiarotti fencing clan.
- Aldo Nadi, won gold and silver medals at 1920 Olympics; during the Mussolini years emigrated to US, where he penned the influential "On Fencing" and his autobiographical notes entitled "The Living Sword"; brother of Nedo Nadi.
- Nedo Nadi, won six Olympic gold medals: three foil, two sabre, and one épée; brother of Aldo Nadi.
- Giuseppe Radaelli, Milanese fencing master, often regarded as "the father of modern sabre fencing"
- Giorgio Santelli, born in Hungary, son of Italo Santelli, won gold at 1920 Olympics as part of the Italian sabre team; emigrated to US in 1924, coached five U.S. Olympic teams, legendary fencing teacher and popularizer, founder of Santelli salle in New York City.
- Italo Santelli, fencing master who revolutionized sabre fencing and developed the modern Hungarian style in the 1920s.
- Giulio Gaudini, won three Olympic gold, four silver and two bronze medals in three Summer Olympic Games (1928 Summer Olympics, 1932 Summer Olympics, 1936 Summer Olympics).
- Antonella Ragno-Lonzi, Individual Foil Olympic Champion 1972 Summer Olympics.
- Fabio Dal Zotto, Individual Foil Olympic Champion 1976 Summer Olympics.
- Mauro Numa, Individual and Team Foil Olympic Champion 1984 Summer Olympics, Individual and Team Foil World Champion 1985, Team Foil World Champion 1986.
- Valentina Vezzali, won six Olympic gold medals and 15 World Championships gold medals in foil. One of only four athletes in the history of the Summer Olympic Games to have won five medals in the same individual event.

Korea (Republic of Korea)

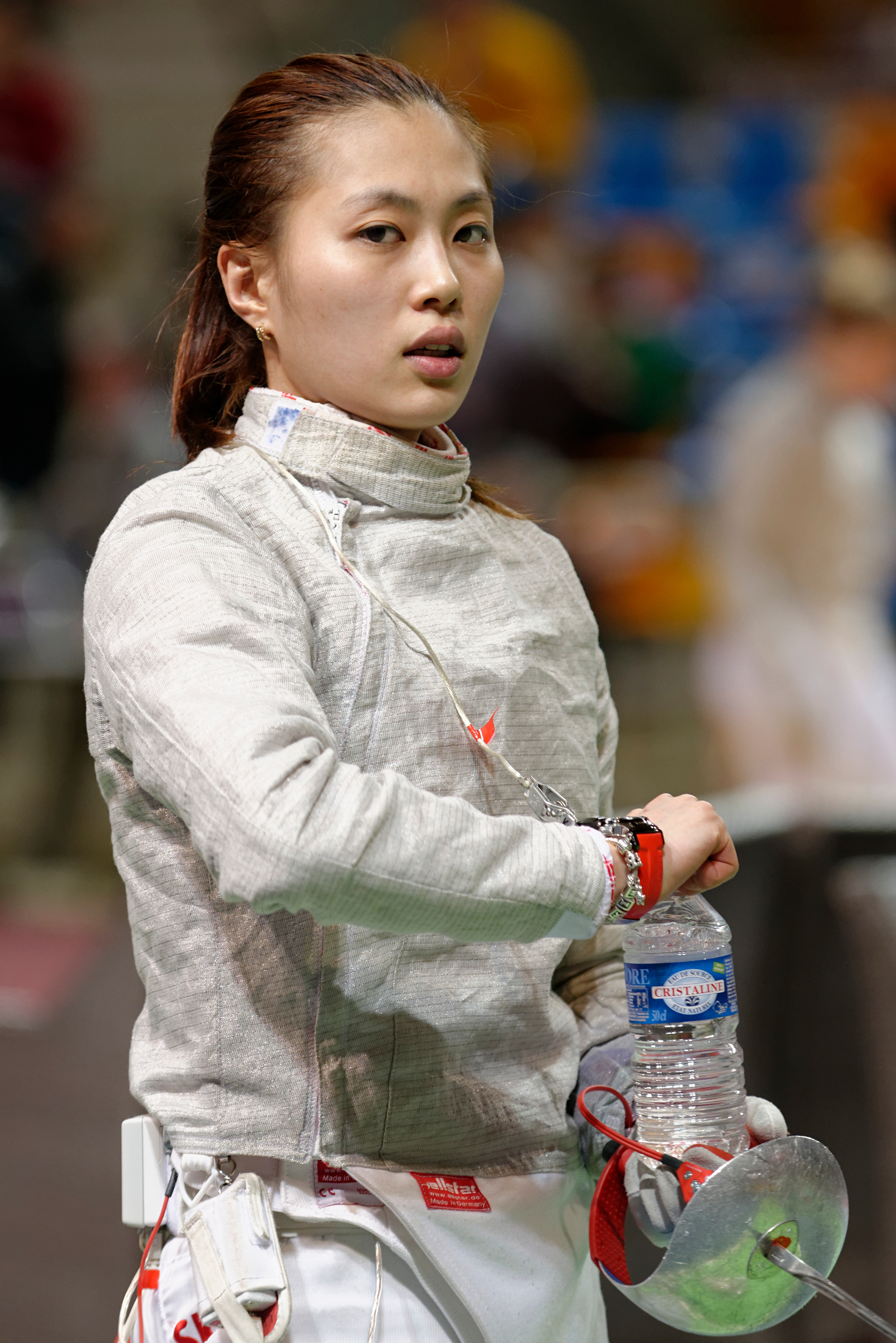
Kim Ji-yeon

- Kim Ji-yeon (Sabre), Individual women's Sabre Olympic Champion (2012 London Olympics)
- Kim Jun Ho (Sabre), 3x team Asian champion, 3x team world champion, and Team Sabre Olympic Champion (2020 Tokyo Olympics)
- Gu Bon-gil (Sabre), Team Sabre Olympic Champion (2012 London Olympics)
- Nam Hyun Hee (Foil), Individual Foil silver (2008 Beijing Olympics), Team Foil bronze (2012 London Olympics)
- Jeon Hee-sook (Foil), women's Team Foil bronze (2012 London Olympics)
- Choi Byung-chul (Foil), Individual Foil bronze (2012 London Olympics)
- Shin A Lam (Épée), Team Foil silver (2012 London Olympics)
- Park Sang-young, individual epee Olympic champion
- Jung Jin-sun (Épée), Individual Épée bronze (2012 London Olympics)

Philippines

- Don Francisco Dayrit Sr., fencer, known as the Father of Philippine Fencing, FIE Hall of Fame.

Poland

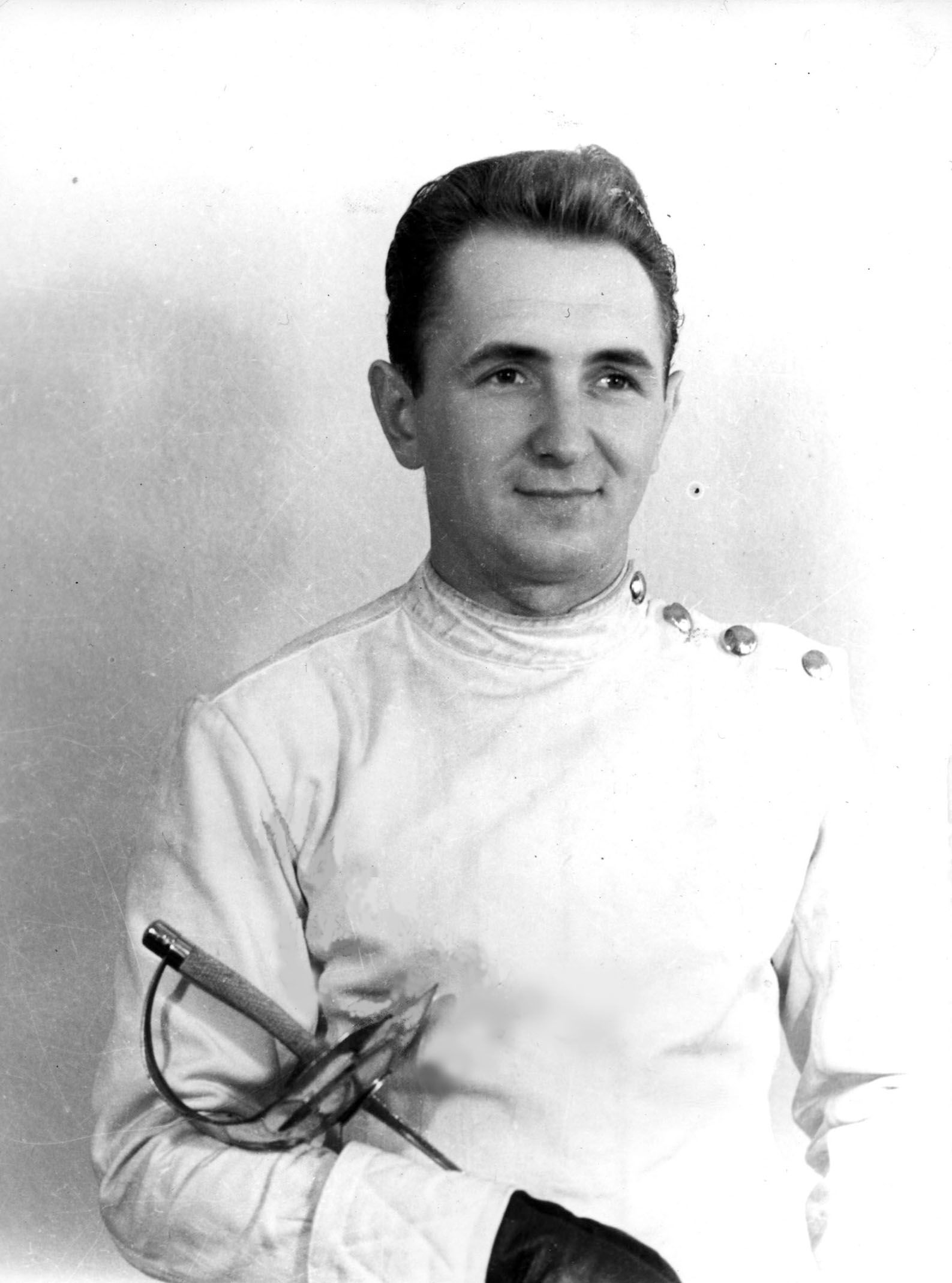
Jerzy Pawłowski

- Danuta Dmowska, Polish fencer, world and European champion
- Egon Franke, Polish fencer, 3x Olympic medalist, world champion
- Ryszard Parulski, Polish fencer, Olympic silver and bronze medalist
- Jerzy Pawłowski, Polish fencer, 5x Olympic medalist, 7x world champion
- Ryszard Sobczak, Polish fencer, Olympic silver and bronze medalist
- Aleksandra Socha, Polish fencer, 2x European champion
- Witold Woyda, Polish fencer, double Olympic champion
- Barbara Wysoczańska, Polish fencer, Olympic bronze medalist
- Wojciech Zabłocki, Polish fencer, 4x world champion

Romania

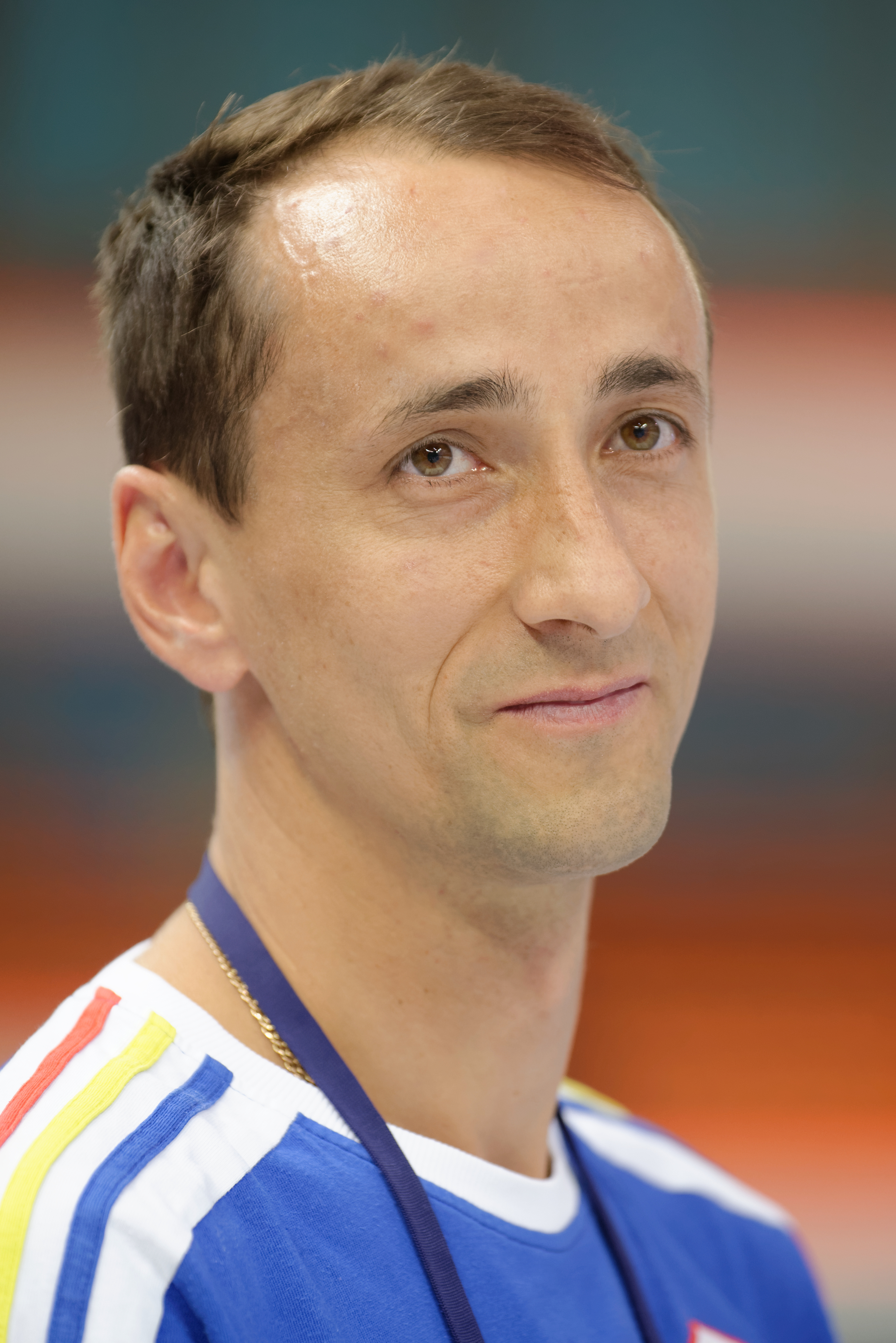
Mihai Covaliu

- Ana Maria Popescu, team world champion in 2010, 4x European team champion
- Mihai Covaliu, Olympic champion, coach of Romanian fencing team
- Rareș Dumitrescu, sabreur, won silver medal at 2012 Olympics in the team contest, world champion with the team in 2009, European champion with the team in 2006.
- Tiberiu Dolniceanu, sabreur, won silver medal at 2012 Olympics in the team contest, world champion with the team in 2009, European champion with the team in 2006.
- Simona Gherman, world team champion in 2010, 4x European team champion
- Anca Măroiu, world champion in 2010 with the team, 4x European team champion
- Florin Zalomir, sabreur, won silver medal at 2012 Olympics in the team contest, world champion with the team in 2009, European team champion in 2006.

Russia/Soviet Union

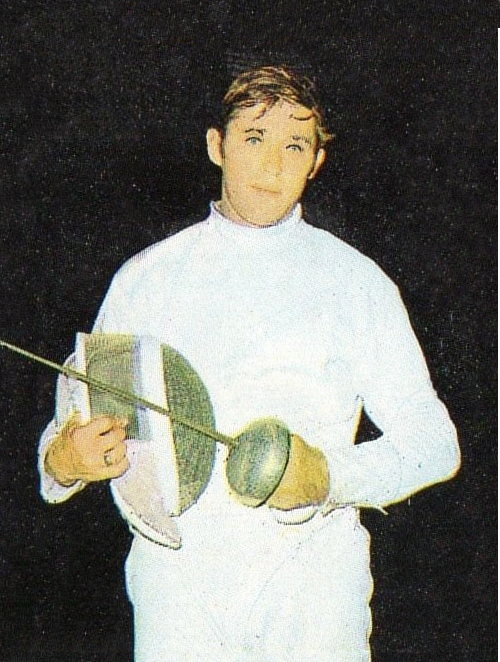
Grigory Kriss

- Vasyl Stankovych (born 1946), Ukrainian foil fencer (USSR), 5x World Champion (1969, 1970, 1971, 1973, 1974), 2x Olympic silver medalist (1968, 1972)
- Sergey Bida (born 1993), Olympic silver, ranked #1 in the world
- Yelena Grishina (born 1968), Olympic fencer, 2x world team silver
- Pavel Kolobkov, épéeist, Olympic Champion 2000, 5x world champion (1991, 1993, 1994, 2002, 2005), twice Junior World Champion (1987, 1988), winner of 1999 World Cup
- Grigory Kriss, Soviet fencer (épée), Olympic champion, 2x silver
- Viktor Krovopouskov, sabreur, 4x Olympic gold medalist (1976 and 1980 individual, and team), twice individual World Champion (1978, 1982), twice won the World Cup (1976, 1979)
- Konstantin Lokhanov (born 1998), sabreur, 2x junior world champion
- Maria Mazina, Jewish Russian fencer (épée), Olympic champion, bronze
- Mark Midler, foilist, Jewish Russian member of first generation of internationally successful Soviet fencers, took gold at 1956 and 1960 Olympics as a part of Soviet team, won four consecutive World Championships (1959–1962).
- Vladimir Nazlymov, sabreur/coach, two-time individual World Champion, team gold at three Olympics and at 8 World Championships, twice named the world's best sabre fencer by the FIE, former head coach of the Ohio State University fencing team who retired in lieu of termination during an NCAA investigation
- Boris Onishchenko, modern pentathlete, individual silver medalist and team gold medalist in 1972, disqualified in 1976 for using a rigged weapon
- Stanislav Pozdnyakov, sabreur, Olympic and 5x world champion, 7x winner of World Cup, 4x member of winning Olympic sabre team, and 4x at world championships
- Mark Rakita, Jewish Russian sabreur, 2x Olympic Champion (1964, 1968), 2x silver, World Champion in 1967, David Tyshler's pupil and coach in his own right (pupils include Viktor Sidjak)
- Alexander Romankov, Russian foilist, 10x world champion
- Yakov Rylsky, Jewish Russian sabreur, 2x Olympic (1964, 1968) and 3x World (1958, 1961, 1963) Champion, represented USSR over a period of 14 years (1953–1966)
- Sergey Sharikov, Jewish Russian sabreur, 2x Olympic Champion (1996, 2000)
- Viktor Sidjak, Soviet sabreur, 4x Olympic gold medalist
- Vladimir Smirnov, foilist, won individual gold at 1980 Summer Olympics, won world championships in 1981, died at 1982 World Championships in Rome, when a broken blade went through his mask causing a fatal brain injury (through the left eye orbit—not the eye itself); his death prompted an extensive review of safety standards in fencing. Tragic though his death was, it ultimately resulted in making the sport statistically safer than golf.
- David Tyshler, Jewish Russian sabreur, member of the first generation of internationally successful Soviet fencers, won medals at 1956 Olympics and five World Championships, best known for his achievements as a coach, one of the founding fathers of the Soviet school of fencing, pupils include Mark Rakita and Viktor Sidjak
- Eduard Vinokurov, Jewish Russian sabreur, 2x Olympic champion (1968, 1976), silver
- Iosif Vitebskiy, Jewish Russian épée fencer, 19x national championship medalist.

Sweden

- Johan Harmenberg, Swedish fencer (épée), Olympic champion (1980)
- Björne Väggö, Swedish fencer (épée), silver medalist in 1984 Olympics

Switzerland

- Marcel Fischer, fencer (épée), Olympic champion (2004)

Taiwan

- Chen Yi-tung, fencer (foil), competed at the 2024 Summer Olympics

Ukraine

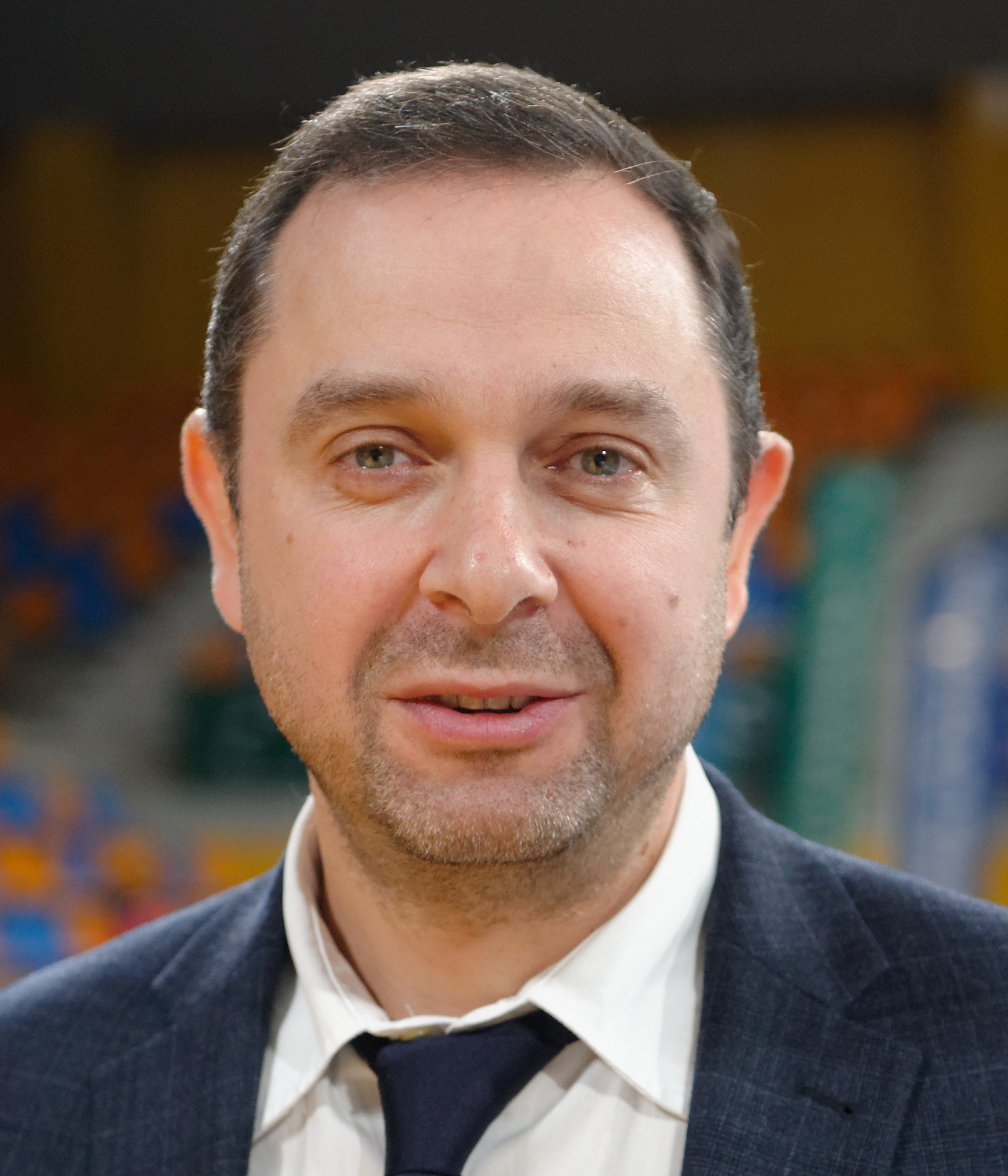
Vadim Gutzeit

- Yury Gelman (born 1955), Ukrainian-born American Olympic fencing coach
- Sergei Golubitsky, World Foil Champion 1997, 1998, 1999; Winner of 1992, 1993, 1994 and 1999 World Cup, Olympic silver medalist 1992.
- Vadim Gutzeit, Ukrainian fencer (saber), Olympic champion, world championship silver and bronze
- Grigory Kriss, épée, Olympic champion, 2× silver
- David Tyshler, saber fencer, Olympic bronze
- Iosif Vitebskiy, épée fencer, Olympic silver, 10x national champion, world champion

United States

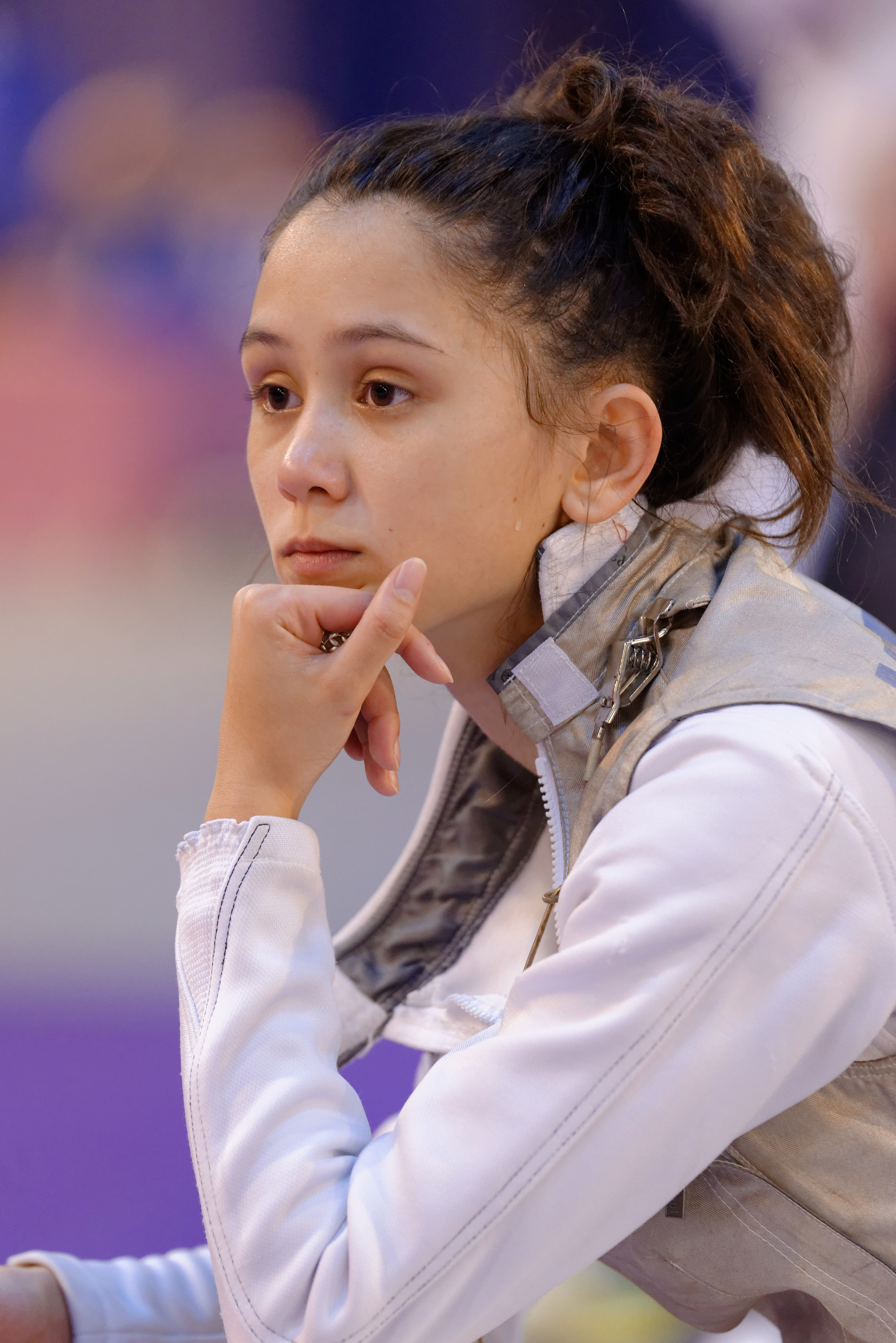
Lee Kiefer

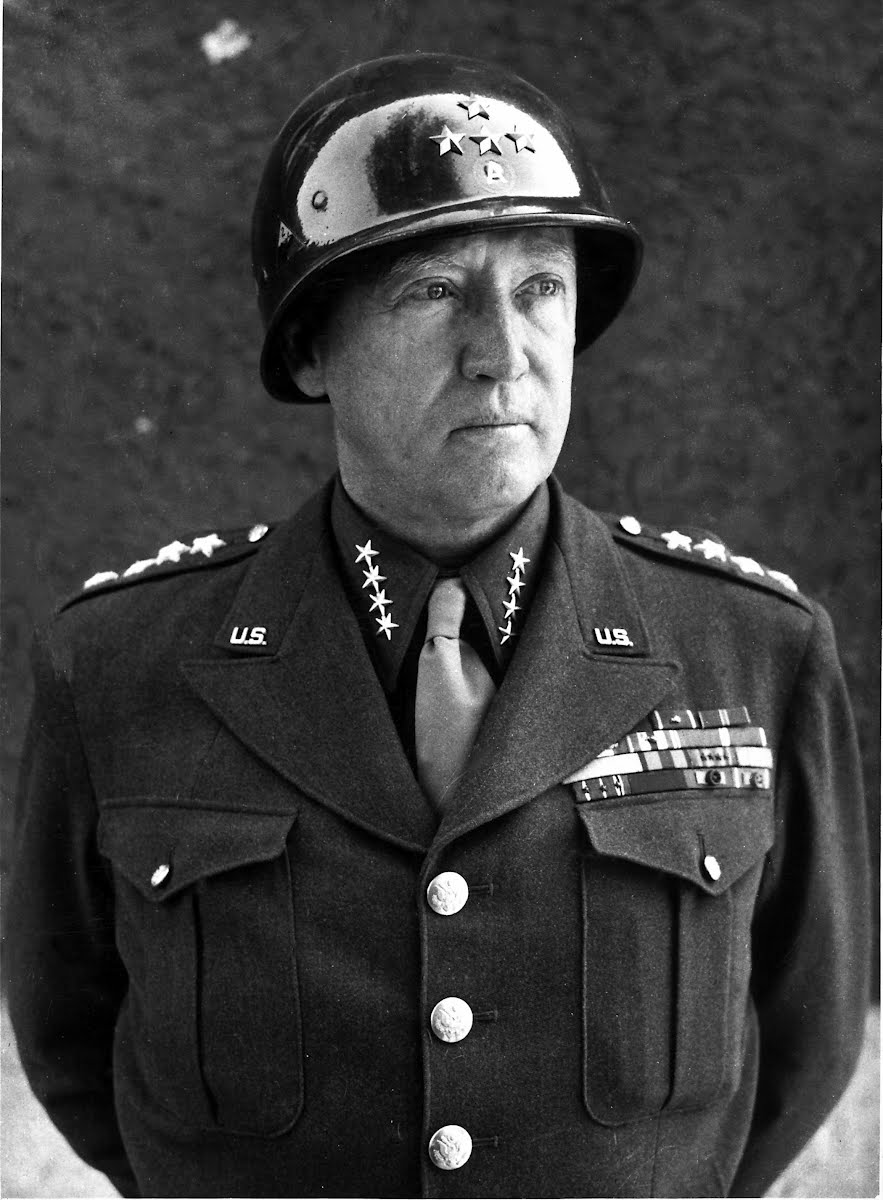
General George Patton

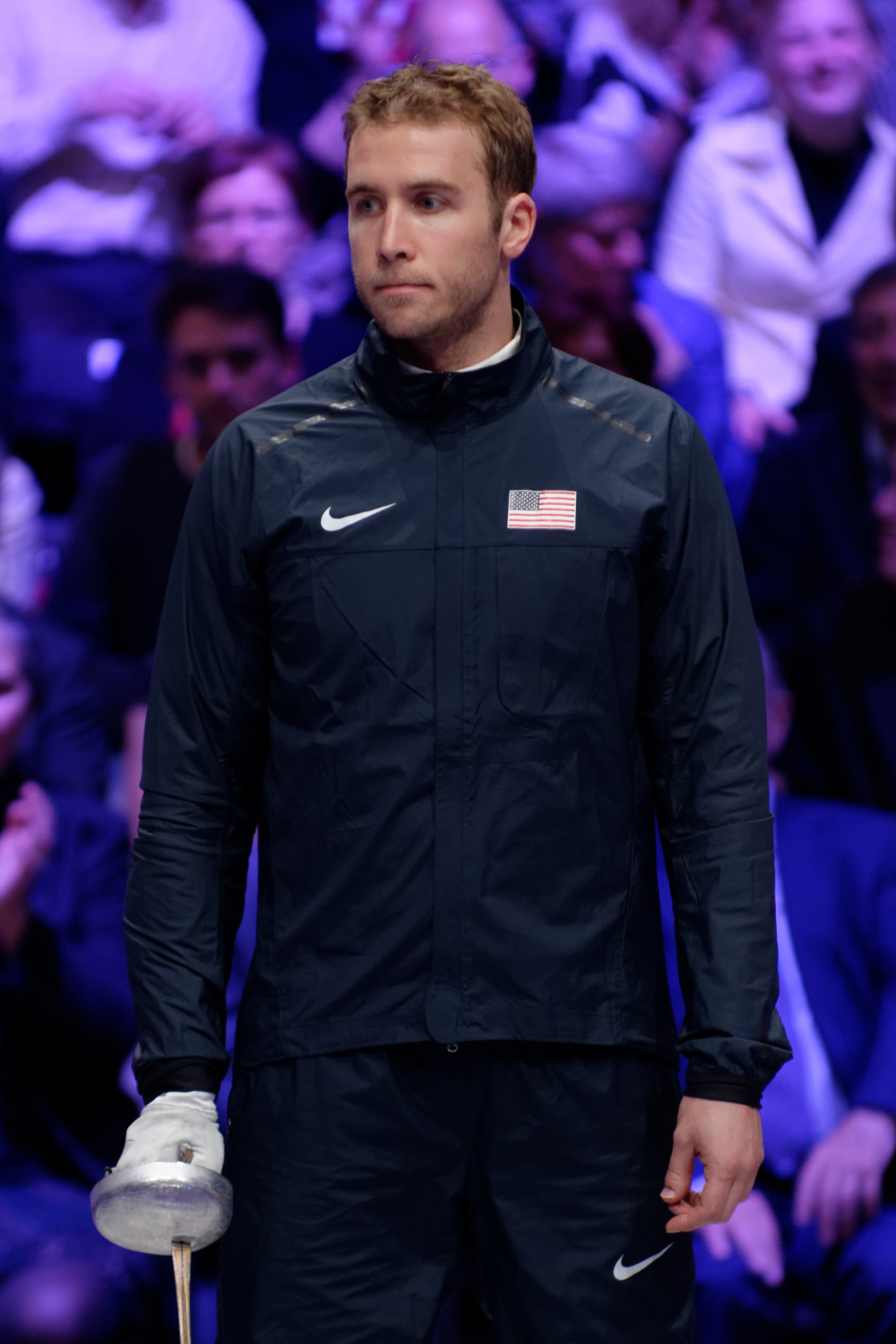
Soren Thompson

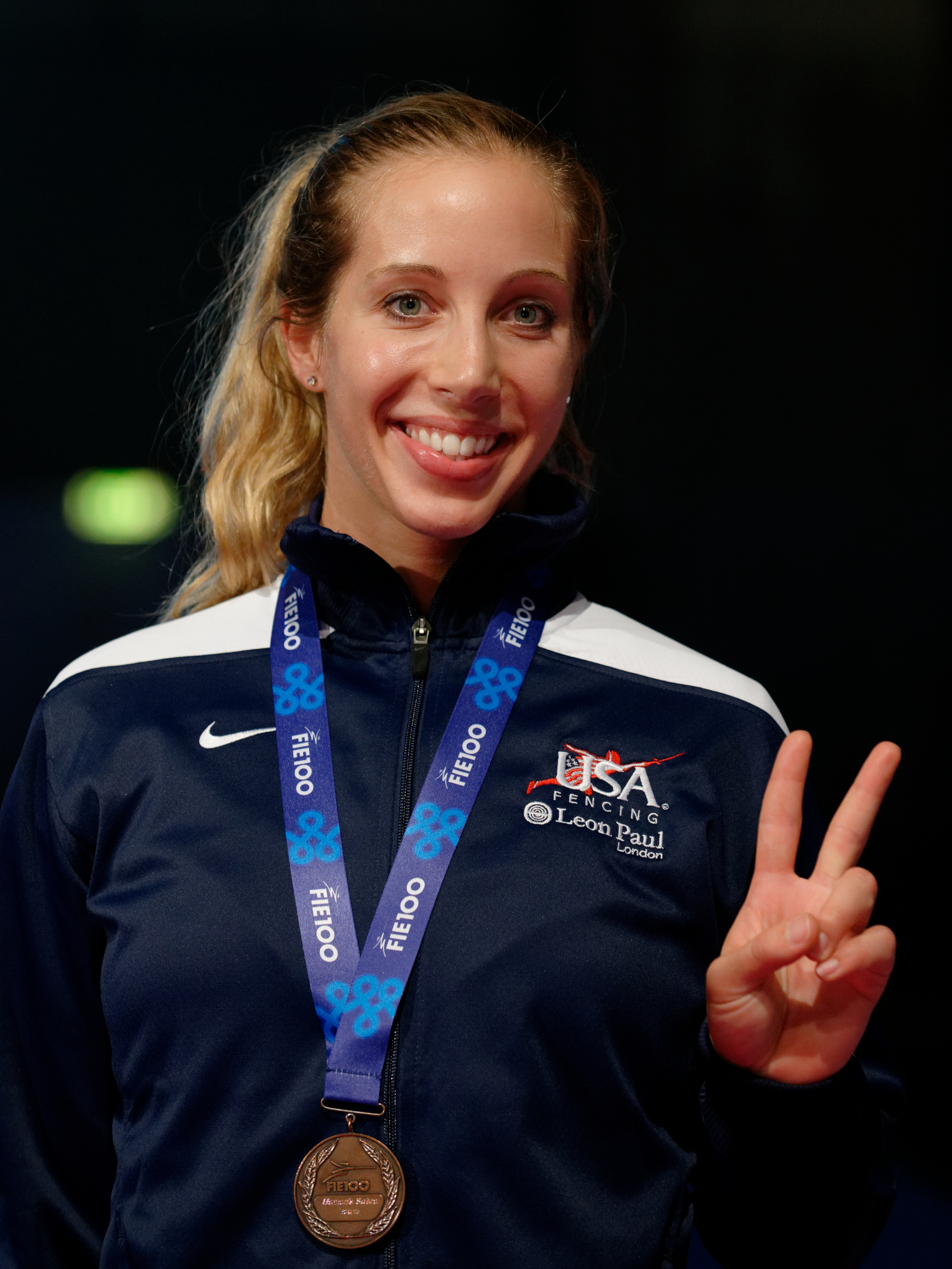
Mariel Zagunis

- Maitre Michel Alaux (1924–1974), French-American fencing master and author; 3x U.S. Olympic coach.
- Norman Armitage (born Norman Cudworth Cohn), 17x national sabre champion
- Albert Axelrod, Jewish American bronze medalist in the 1960 Summer Olympics in foil
- Abraham Balk, only man to win both foil and epeé NCAA championships (1947)
- Cliff Bayer, 4x U.S. foil champion
- Caitlin Bilodeaux, 4x USFA Women's Foil Champ; tied for third on the women's championship list. Pan American Individual and Team champion, 1987, 2x NCAA women's foil champion. 2x U-20 National Champion.
- Tamir Bloom, 2x U.S. épée champion
- Muriel Bower, first woman fencing master in the U.S.
- Daniel Bukantz, Jewish American Olympian, foil fencer, member of Jewish Sports Hall of Fame
- Miles Chamley-Watson, British-American foil fencer, 3x Olympian, Olympic bronze medalist, 13x team Pan Am Champion
- Michael D'Asaro Sr., fencing master and coach
- Eli Dershwitz, saber, world championship silver medal, US champion, world champion, junior world champion, 4x Pan-American champion, NCAA champion
- Jed Dupree, 2004 Olympian, 2002 U.S. National champion, 2003 Pan American gold medal, 2001 NCAA Men's Foil champion
- Csaba Elthes, legendary coach to 6 U.S. Olympic teams, immigrated from Hungary
- Nikki Franke, foil fencer, Olympian, and coach, Pan Am silver and bronze medalist, 4x USFCA Coach of the year
- Daryl Homer, saber fencer, 3x Olympian, Olympic silver medalist, 10x team Pan Am Champion, 3x individual Pan Am Champion
- Race Imboden, 2012 Olympian, 2x U.S. National Men's Foil Champion, 2x Pan Am Champion, Men's Foil World Cup gold medalist
- Nick Itkin, foil, Olympic bronze medal, world championship bronze medal, 2x NCAA champion, Pan American champion
- Emily Jacobson, NCAA sabre champion, junior world champion
- Sada Jacobson, Jewish American saber silver medalist in the 2008 Summer Olympics and 2x bronze medalist; first American female to be ranked # 1 in the world, and the second American ever to be ranked # 1 in the world, 2× world team champion.
- Uriah Jones, foil fencer and coach, first African American fencer to compete in the Olympics in 1968, member of the U.S. National, U.S. World, and U.S. Pan American championship teams. Inductee of the US Fencing Association Hall of Fame
- Dan Kellner, U.S. foil champion
- Lee Kiefer (born 1994), Olympic women's champion, 4x NCAA champion
- Ed Korfanty, U.S. National women's sabre team coach. Formerly Polish national coach.
- Byron Krieger, U.S. 2x Olympian, Pan American Games team gold/silver
- Allan Kwartler, U.S. foil and sabre fencer, winner of gold medals in Pan American Games and Maccabiah Games
- Michael Marx 5x Olympian, Épée and Foil Coach, National Champion
- Helene Mayer, German and U.S. fencer (foil), Olympic champion
- Curtis McDowald, épée fencer and Olympian, Pan Am bronze medalist
- Gerek Meinhardt, foil fencer
- Sharon Monplaisir, foil fencer
- Tim Morehouse, won silver medal in men's sabre at 2008 Summer Olympics
- Ibtihaj Muhammad, saber fencer and Olympic bronze medalist, 5x world medalist, World Fencing Gold Medalist, first American woman to compete in the Olympics in a hijab
- George S. Patton, 4th out of 27 fencers in 1912 Olympic Games
- Julia Jones Pugliese, first U.S. women's intercollegiate fencing champion (1929), founded the Intercollegiate Women's Fencing Association (with Dorothy Hafner and Elizabeth Ross), first woman coach of an international U.S. fencing team, coached NYU women's team 1932–1938, and Hunter team 1956–1992
- Janice Romary, 1948, 1952, 1956, 1960, 1964, 1968 Olympian foil fencer.
- Jason Rogers, saber team silver medal at the 2008 Summer Olympics
- Giorgio Santelli, legendary coach to 5 U.S. Olympic teams (1928–1952), Olympic gold medalist (1920 Men's Sabre Team), son of Italo Santelli (known as the "father of modern sabre fencing" and an Olympic silver medal winner), fought duel after his father was insulted by Italian team Captain.
- Lauren Scruggs, foil fencer, Olympic silver medalist (individual), first Black American woman to win an individual medal in fencing, Olympic gold medalist (team), NCAA Champion, one of three black fencers from the United States to have won an individual world championship.
- Maitre Michel Sebastiani, coached fencing at Princeton University 1982–2006, and before that coached fencing at Brooklyn College, New York University (NYU), and Cornell. Coached his teams to 11 national championships. In 1994 and again in 2006 was named the most outstanding Coach of the Year by U.S. Fencing Coaches Association (USFCA). Developed 5 NCAA individual men's champions and 3 NCAA individual women's champions. Was a 1960 French Modern Pentathlon Olympic Team selection.
- Erinn Smart, foil fencer and Olympian, NCAA All-American, 5x US National Champion
- Keeth Smart, first American to be ranked # 1 in the world, member of the silver medal winning U.S. men's sabre team at the 2008 Summer Olympics, member of 2004 gold medal U.S. Men's Sabre team at World Cup
- Soren Thompson, U.S. (épée), World Team Champion, U.S. Junior Champion, U.S. champion, NCAA champion
- Jonathan Tiomkin, 2x U.S. foil champion.
- Rebecca Ward, bronze medalist in the 2008 Summer Olympics in women's sabre, 2005 FIE Jr. World Champion at age 15. Bronze medal in sabre team at the 2008 Summer Olympics. Gold in Women's Sabre team sy 2005 World Championship. 2006 Cadet World Champion, 2006 Jr. World Champion, 2006 Jr. World Champion Team member.
- Ruby Watson, épée and sabre fencer, 2025 Hall of Fame nominee, activist for inclusion of women in the sport
- Peter Westbrook, bronze medalist in the 1984 Summer Olympics, 13x U.S. National Men's Sabre Champion, author of Harnessing Anger, founder of the Peter Westbrook Foundation, teaching and helping youth through sport.
- Ruth White, competed at the 1972 Summer Olympics, was the first African-American woman to represent the United States at the Olympics and is a Pan American Games medalist
- George Worth (born György Woittitz), U.S. (saber), Olympic bronze, U.S. champion, 3x Pan American champion
- Mariel Leigh Zagunis, 2x Olympic gold medalist in women's sabre (in the 2008 Summer Olympics and in the first-ever women's sabre event at the 2004 Summer Olympics); first American woman to win gold; first American to win gold since 1904. Member of the bronze medal winning U.S. women's sabre team at the 2008 Summer Olympics

Venezuela

- Rubén Limardo, Men's Individual Épée Olympic Champion 2012, 2013 Budapest World Championship silver medalist.
- Rafael Suárez, Men's Individual & Team Foil Olympics 1996; Cadet, Junior and Senior World Cup Medalist; Pan-American, Centro-American, and South-American Champion.

== Fencing masters of the pre-Olympic era ==
14th century

- Fiore dei Liberi

15th century

- Johannes Liechtenauer
- Sigmund Ringeck
- Peter von Danzig Cod. 44 A 8
- Hans Talhoffer

16th century

- Camillo Agrippa
- Giacomo di Grassi
- Antonio Manciolino
- Achille Marozzo
- Angelo Viggiani
- Giovanni Dall'Agocchie
- Vincentio Saviolo
- George Silver
- Joachim Meyer

17th century

- Francesco Alfieri
- Salvator Fabris
- Ridolfo Capo Ferro
- Girard Thibault

18th century

- Domenico Angelo
- Chevalier de Saint-Georges

19th century

- Alfred Hutton

== Famous duelists and fencing enthusiasts ==
- Otto von Bismarck
- Tycho Brahe
- George Byron
- Winston Churchill
- René Descartes
- Neil Diamond
- Bruce Dickinson
- Albrecht Dürer
- Reinhard Heydrich
- Jean-François Lamour
- Colonel Thomas Hoyer Monstery
- Benito Mussolini
- George S. Patton, General and U.S. Army Master of the Sword. Designer of the Model 1913 Cavalry Saber. 1912 Stockholm Olympics in the first modern pentathlon competition (Ranked 1st in fencing – 8th overall).
- José Rizal
- Theodore Roosevelt
- Sylvester Stallone
- Arnold Schwarzenegger
- Otto Skorzeny
