= Fencing in India =

- Country: India
- Governing body: Fencing Association of India
- National team: See below

International competitions
- Olympic Games (gold) x0 (silver) x0 (bronze) x0 Paralympic Games (gold) x0 (silver) x0 (bronze) x0 World Championship (gold) x0 (silver) x0 (bronze) x0 World Cup (gold) x0 (silver) x0 (bronze) x0 Commonwealth Games (gold) x0 (silver) x0 (bronze) x0 Commonwealth Championship (gold) x4 (silver) x0 (bronze) x2 Asian Games (gold) x0 (silver) x0 (bronze) x0 Asian Championship (gold) x0 (silver) x0 (bronze) x1 South Asian Games (gold) x11 (silver) x5 (bronze) x1

Fencing in India started with the foundation of the Fencing Association of India in 1974. It was recognized by the Indian Government in 1997. It is affiliated with the Indian Olympic Association, Fencing Confederation of Asia, Commonwealth Fencing Federation and the International Fencing Federation. India has produced some international level fencers who have performed well over the years.

== Background ==
The association has been holding national competitions in Sub-Junior (1999), Cadet (2004), Junior (1992) and Senior (1986) categories.

In 2016, at the Asian Junior and Cadet Fencing Championships in Damam, Saudi Arabia, the Indian contingent won two silver and three bronze medals. In the individual events, 17-year-old Karan Singh clinched bronze in the Junior Boys Sabre event while SN Siva Magesh, 14, won silver in the Cadet Boys Épée event. This was the first time that India won a medal in the Junior category.

In May 2017, India's Bhavani Devi won the gold medal in the sabre event of the Turnoi Satellite Fencing Championship held at Reykjavík in Iceland and became the first Indian to win a gold medal in an international fencing event. Shilpa Garg had previously won a silver medal in a satellite event.

== Medal table ==
Tournament	1st place, gold medalist(s)	2nd place, silver medalist(s)	3rd place, bronze medalist(s)	Total
Olympic Games	0	0	0	0
Paralympic Games	0	0	0	0
World Championships	0	0	0	0
World Cup	0	0	0	0
Commonwealth Games	0	0	0	0
Commonwealth Championships	4	1	2	6
Asian Games	0	0	0	0
Asian Championships	0	0	1	1
South Asian Games	11	5	1	17
Total	15	5	4	24

== Senior record ==
=== Commonwealth Championships ===
Year	Fencer	Type	Category	Medal
2010	Ajinkya Dudhare; Tukaram M Amardeep; Jayanta Singh; Himalaya	Epee	Men's team	2nd place, silver medalist(s)
2018	Bhavani Devi	Sabre	Women's individual	1st place, gold medalist(s)
2018	Karan Singh Gurjar; Vishal Thapar; Gisho Nidhi Kumaresan Padma; Sagar Shahi; Manpreet Singh	Sabre	Men's team	1st place, gold medalist(s)
2018	Karan Singh Gurjar	Sabre	Men's individual	3rd place, bronze medalist(s)
2022	Bhavani Devi	Sabre	Women's individual	1st place, gold medalist(s)
2022	Udaivir Singh; Sunil Kumar; S. N. Siva Magesh; Chingakham Jetlee Singh	Épée	Men's team	1st place, gold medalist(s)
2022	Gisho Nidhi Kumaresan Padma	Sabre	Men's individual	3rd place, bronze medalist(s)

=== Asian Championships ===
Year	Fencer	Type	Medal
2023	Bhavani Devi	Sabre	3rd place, bronze medalist(s)

=== South Asian Games ===
Year	Fencer	Type	Category	Medal
2019	Thoudam Kabita Devi	Épée	Women's individual	1st place, gold medalist(s)
2019	Sunil Kumar	Épée	Men's individual	1st place, gold medalist(s)
2019	Arrora Dahiwal; Sheetal Dalal; Thoudam Kabita Devi	Épée	Women's team	1st place, gold medalist(s)
2019	Guruprakash Coppara; Jetlee Singh Chingakham; Sunil Kumar	Épée	Men's team	1st place, gold medalist(s)
2019	Thoibi Devi Wangelbam	Foil	Women's individual	1st place, gold medalist(s)
2019	Vinoth Kumar Velautham	Foil	Men's individual	1st place, gold medalist(s)
2019	Radhika Prakash Awati; Rani Devi; Thoibi Devi Wangelbam	Foil	Women's team	1st place, gold medalist(s)
2019	Bicky Thokchom; Rajeshor Singh Thounaojam; Vinoth Kumar Velautham	Foil	Men's team	1st place, gold medalist(s)
2019	Karan Singh Gurjar	Sabre	Men's individual	1st place, gold medalist(s)
2019	Josna Jose; Jagmeet Kaur; Komalpreet Shukla; Diana Devi Thingujam	Sabre	Women's team	1st place, gold medalist(s)
2019	Gisho Kumaresan; Shahi Singh; Karan Singh Gurjar	Sabre	Men's team	1st place, gold medalist(s)
2019	Sheetal Dalal	Épée	Women's individual	2nd place, silver medalist(s)
2019	Guruprakash Coppara	Épée	Men's individual	2nd place, silver medalist(s)
2019	Radhika Prakash Awati	Foil	Women's individual	2nd place, silver medalist(s)
2019	Rajeshor Singh	Foil	Men's individual	2nd place, silver medalist(s)
2019	Gisho Kumaresan	Sabre	Men's individual	2nd place, silver medalist(s)
2019	Diana Devi Thingujam	Sabre	Women's individual	3rd place, bronze medalist(s)

== Junior record ==
=== Commonwealth Championships ===
Year	Fencer	Type	Category	Medal
2015	Karan Singh Gurjar	Sabre	Men's individual	1st place, gold medalist(s)
2015	Karan Singh Gurjar	Sabre	Men's individual	2nd place, silver medalist(s)
2018	Rajendran Sherjin	Épée	Men's individual	1st place, gold medalist(s)
2018	Rajendran Sherjin	Épée	Men's team	1st place, gold medalist(s)
2018		Foil	Men's team	2nd place, silver medalist(s)
2018	Karan Singh Gurjar; Manpreet Singh	Sabre	Men's team	2nd place, silver medalist(s)
2018	Karan Singh Gurjar	Sabre	Men's individual	3rd place, bronze medalist(s)
2018	Abhay Shinde	Sabre	Men's individual	3rd place, bronze medalist(s)
2018		Épée	Women's team	3rd place, bronze medalist(s)
2018	Shreya Gupta; Alka Sunny	Sabre	Women's team	3rd place, bronze medalist(s)
2022	Taniksha Khatri	Épée	Women's individual	2nd place, silver medalist(s)
2022	Abi Devi Laishram	Sabre	Women's individual	2nd place, silver medalist(s)
2022	Oinam Singh	Sabre	Men's individual	2nd place, silver medalist(s)
2022	Taniksha Khatri; Kashvi Garg; Dnyaneshwari Shinde; Pragya Singh	Épée	Women's team	2nd place, silver medalist(s)
2022	Oinam Singh; Prince Sharma; Rishikesh Jaiswal; Dhruv Walia	Sabre	Men's team	2nd place, silver medalist(s)
2022	Shaik Naziya	Épée	Women's individual	3rd place, bronze medalist(s)
2022	Prince Sharma	Sabre	Men's individual	3rd place, bronze medalist(s)
2022	Kashvi Garg; Prachi Lohan; Sejal Gulia; Shaik Naziya	Épée	Women's team	3rd place, bronze medalist(s)
2022	Kritarthi Kotwal; Shreya Gupta; Abi Devi Laishram; Babyreddy Murikinati	Sabre	Women's team	3rd place, bronze medalist(s)
2022	Kashish Bharad; J.R. Jefarlin; Abi Devi Laishram; Gauri Solanke	Sabre	Women's team	3rd place, bronze medalist(s)

=== Asian Championships ===
Year	Fencer	Type	Category	Medal
2016	Karan Singh Gurjar	Sabre	Men's individual	3rd place, bronze medalist(s)
2022	Taniksha Khatri; Tannu Gulia; Pragya Singh; Aditri Patil	Épée	Women's team	2nd place, silver medalist(s)
2022	Prachi Lohan; Govindnoor Kaur; Nelcyrose Saikhom Devi; Shaik Naziya	Épée	Women's team	2nd place, silver medalist(s)
2022	Prachi Lohan	Épée	Women's individual	3rd place, bronze medalist(s)
2022	Kanupriya, Khusboorani Laishram, Naorem Mina Devi, Kusum	Foil	Women's team	3rd place, bronze medalist(s)
2022	Ningthouba Sukham; Dev; Denny Singh Konsam; Sathvik Shoba Manjunatha	Foil	Men's team	3rd place, bronze medalist(s)
2022	Shreya Gupta; Abi Devi Laishram; Himanshi Negi; Shiksha Ballouria	Sabre	Women's team	3rd place, bronze medalist(s)
2022	Abi Devi Laishram	Sabre	Women's team	3rd place, bronze medalist(s)
2022	Kangabam Kane Singh; Aryan Sen; Agamvir Singh; Lokesh Vemani	Épée	Men's team	3rd place, bronze medalist(s)
2022	Charvi; Kanupriya; Vaidehi Lohiya; Sonia Devi Waikhom	Foil	Women's team	3rd place, bronze medalist(s)

== Current rankings ==
=== Women's sabre ===
#	Fencer	World Rank	Points
1	Bhavani Devi	43	38.000
2	Sowmiya Sundara	161	6.000

=== Women's epee ===
#	Fencer	World Rank	Points
1	Taniksha Khatri	140	7.500
2	Prachi Lohan	155	6.250
3	Sheetal Dalal	234	3.000
4	Ena Arora	375	0.500

=== Men's sabre ===
#	Fencer	World Rank	Points
1	Karan Singh Gurjar	83	15.500

=== Men's epee ===
#	Fencer	World Rank	Points
1	Jetlee Singh Chingakham	114	12.000
2	Udaivir Singh	337	1.375

== National award recipients ==
Year	Recipient	Award	Gender
2021	Bhavani Devi	Arjuna Award	Female
