= Eloise Smith (fencer) =

British fencer and children's author (born 1978)

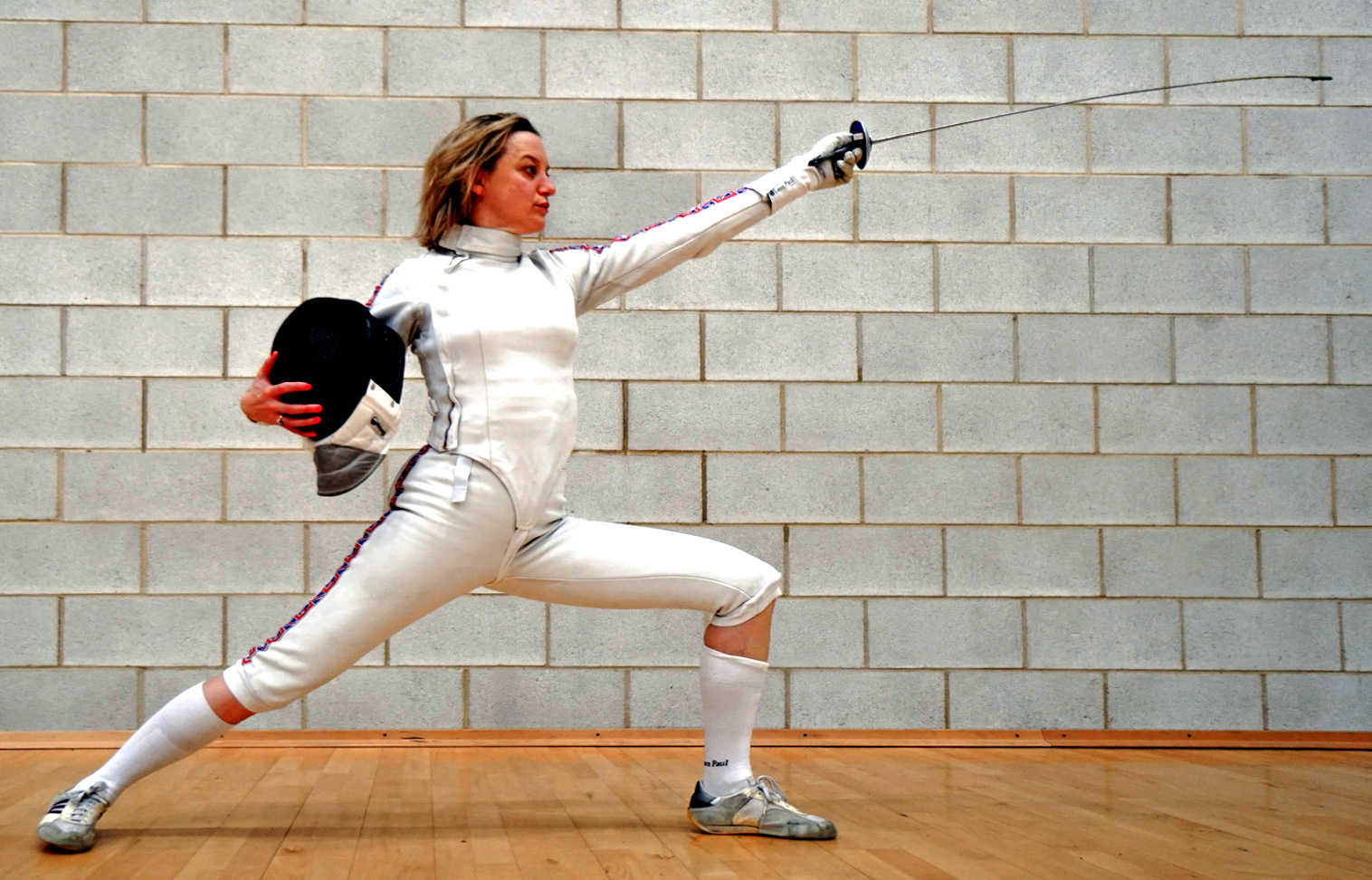

Personal information
- Nationality: British
- Born: 2 January 1978 (age 48)
- Education: Haberdashers' Aske's School for Girls, Elstree; St Edmund Hall, Oxford

Sport
- Sport: Fencing

Eloise Smith (born 2 January 1978) is a British fencer. She competed in the women's individual foil event at the 2000 Summer Olympics. She was Commonwealth fencing champion in Individual Women's Foil in 1998 and 2002. From 1997 to 2004, she represented Great Britain at every World Fencing Championships and was British Individual Women's Foil No. 1. She was coached by Ziemowit Wojciechowski at Salle Paul.

She attended Haberdashers' Aske's School for Girls, Elstree, before studying English Literature and Language at St Edmund Hall, Oxford, where she graduated in 1999.

Eloise was an Executive Creative Director in advertising before becoming a children's author.

== International competitions ==
Competition	Year	Location	Results
World Fencing Championships	2003	(Cuba) Havana	
Commonwealth Fencing Championships	2002	(Australia) Newcastle	Individual Gold; Team Bronze
World Fencing Championships	2002	(Portugal) Lisbon	
World Fencing Championships	2001	(France) Nîmes	
Olympic Games	2000	(Australia) Sydney	
World Fencing Championships	1999	(South Korea) Seoul	
Commonwealth Fencing Championships	1998	(Malaysia) Shah Alam	Individual Gold; Team Gold
World Fencing Championships	1998	(Portugal) Lisbon	
Junior World Fencing Championships	1997	(Spain) Tenerife	
Junior World Fencing Championships	1996	(Belgium) Tournai	
Junior World Fencing Championships	1995	(France) Paris	
Junior World Fencing Championships	1994	Mexico City	

== Writing ==
Eloise's debut middle-grade fiction title, Sister To A Star, was published by Chicken House Books in May 2022. Her second book, Winner Takes Gold was released in Jan 2024. The Times awarded it Children's Book of the Week, describing it as "a gymnastics thriller with a twist . . . a lively whodunnit set in an elite training camp for young gymnasts."

== Education ==
Eloise attended Haberdashers' Aske's School for Girls, Elstree, before studying English Literature and Language at St Edmund Hall, Oxford, where she graduated in 1999. In 2001, she studied at West Herts College for a diploma in Copywriting and Art Direction for Advertising.

== Advertising career ==
Eloise began her career in advertising at marketing and communications company RKCR/ Y&R in 2001 as a creative. In 2004, she moved to St Luke's Communications, followed by digital agency AKQA and digital and social marketing agency Work Club as a creative lead. Here she created The Carte Noire Readers featuring Dominic West, Joseph Fiennes and more.

In 2010, she moved to advertising agency Havas London as a creative director. Notable clients included Citroën, Kraft and evian.

In January 2014, she was appointed Executive Creative Director at digital marketing agency MullenLowe Profero, becoming joint Executive Creative Director at MullenLowe London in 2016, before becoming Group Creative Director of Amazon EU until 2023.
