= Karan Singh Gurjar =

Indian fencer (born 1999)

Personal information
- Full name: Karan Singh Gurjar
- Born: 2 April 1999 (age 27) Alwar, Rajasthan, India
- Home town: Orléans, France

Fencing career
- Sport: Fencing
- Country: India
- Training location: Christian Bauer Academy, France; (2021–present); Netaji Subhas National Institute of Sports
- Weapon: Sabre
- Hand: Right-handed
- Head coach: Christian Bauer; Krishan Rayamajhi
- Highest ranking: 60 (February 2023)
- Current ranking: 54 (September 2025)
- FIE ranking: 83
- FIE profile
Medal record
Men's sabre fencing
Representing India
Commonwealth Championships
Gold medal – first place	2018 Canberra	Team
Bronze medal – third place	2018 Canberra	Individual
South Asian Games
Gold medal – first place	2019 Kathmandu	Individual
Gold medal – first place	2019 Kathmandu	Team
Commonwealth Junior Championships
Gold medal – first place	2015 Cape Town	Individual
Silver medal – second place	2015 Cape Town	Individual
Silver medal – second place	2018 Newcastle	Team
Bronze medal – third place	2018 Newcastle	Individual
Asian Junior Championships
Bronze medal – third place	2016 Dammam–Manama	Individual

Karan Singh Gurjar (born 2 April 1999) is an Indian sabre fencer. He has won a gold and a bronze medal at the Commonwealth Championships. Gurjar is also a double gold medalist at the South Asian Games.

At the junior level, he was won multiple medals at Commonwealth Championships and the Asian Championships.

== Early life ==
Gurjar started his career in 2010 when an athletics coach from the Army Institute of Pune introduced him to fencing. He joined the Indian Navy through the sports quota in 2019.

== Achievements ==
TBA

== Performance record ==
2024–25: World Cup: 16th

== See also ==
- Fencing in India
