= Fencing Association of India =

- Sport: Fencing
- Jurisdiction: India
- Abbreviation: FAI
- Founded: 1974
- Affiliation: International Fencing Federation
- Regional affiliation: Fencing Confederation of Asia
- Headquarters: Delhi, India
- President: Satej Patil
- Secretary: Rajeev Mehta

Official website
- www.fencingindia.org
- (India)

The Fencing Association of India is the governing body for the sport of fencing in India and is recognized by the Indian Olympic Association as one of its National Sports Association members. It is affiliated to the Asian Fencing Confederation, Commonwealth Fencing Federation and the International Fencing Federation. It was founded in 1974 and recognized by the Indian Government in 1997.

== Competitions ==
The association has been holding national competitions in Sub-Junior, Cadet, Junior and Senior categories, for both men and women.

== State federations ==
There are currently 30 state associations and 2 services associations (SSB and SSPB) affiliated with the Fencing Association of India.

- Andhra State Fencing Association
- Arunachal Pradesh Fencing Association
- Assam Fencing Association
- Bihar State Fencing Association
- Bengal State Fencing Association
- Chandigarh, Dadara and Nagar Haveli Fencing Association
- Chhattisgarh Pradesh Fencing Association
- Delhi State Fencing Association
- Goa Fencing Association
- Amateur Fencing Association of Gujarat State
- Haryana State Fencing Association
- Himachal Pradesh State Fencing Association
- Jharkhand Fencing Association
- Jammu and Kashmir State Fencing Association
- Karnataka Fencing Association
- Kerala State Fencing Association
- Madhya Pradesh Fencing Association
- Maharashtra State Fencing Association
- Manipur State Fencing Association
- Meghalaya Fencing Association
- Mizoram State Fencing Association
- Nagaland Fencing Association
- Odisha Fencing Association
- Pondicherry Amateur State Fencing Association
- Punjab State Fencing Association
- Rajasthan State Fencing Association
- Tamil Nadu State Fencing Association
- Fencing Association of Tripura
- Uttar Pradesh State Fencing Association
- Uttarakhand Pradesh Fencing Association
- Services Sports Control Board
- Sashastra Seema Bal
