= 2014 Commonwealth Fencing Championships =

The 2014 Commonwealth Fencing Championships was held in Largs, Scotland between the 10th and 15 November 2014 at the Inverclyde National Sports Training Centre

== Venue ==
The venue was Inverclyde National Sports Training Centre in Largs, Scotland

== Host & Organisers ==
The event was hosted and run by Scottish Fencing and is overseen by the Commonwealth Fencing Federation. The event director was Chris Hyde and the event manager was Roy Clarke.

== Medallists - Men's Events ==
Event	Gold	Silver	Bronze
Individual foil	Jamie Fitzgerald (SCO)	Zhenggang Zhang (SIN)	Jie Wu (SIN); Husayn Rosowsky (ENG)
Team foil	England; Kola Abidogun; Peter Barwell; Ben Peggs; Dan Robinson; Husayn Rosowsky	Scotland; Keith Cook; Jamie Fitzgerald; Scott Brodie; Jack Watson; Callum O'donnell	Australia; Patrick Daley; Matt Foster; Lucas Webber; Dylan Devenish
Individual épée	Dudley Tredger (ENG)	Marc Burkhalter (WAL)	John Downes (AUS); Tom Edwards (WAL)
Team épée	Singapore; Willie Zi Le Khoo; Samson Mun Hou Lee; Wei Wen Lim; Kian Seng Ng	Wales; Gareth Thomas; Marc Burkhalter; David Gregory; James Taylor; Tom Edwards	Scotland; Neill Tannock; Chris Hay; George Liston; Chris Rocks; Tom Hoffmann
Individual Sabre	Alex Crutchett (ENG)	Maiyuran Ratneswaren (ENG)	Glenn Sancroft (SCO); Stephen Rocks (SCO)
Team sabre	England; Alex Crutchett; Maiyuran Ratneswaren; Soji Aiyenuro; Kirk Slankard	Singapore; Yu Yong Choy; Clive Yi Yang Leu; David Wei Ren Chan	Scotland; Michael Clarke; Stephen Rocks; Glenn Sancroft; Rob Veitch

== Medallists - Women's Events ==
Event	Gold	Silver	Bronze
Individual foil	Wenying Wang (SIN)	Chloe Dickson (SCO)	Cheryl Wong (SIN); Cathy Cook (ENG)
Team foil	Singapore	Scotland	England
Individual épée	Georgina Ussher (SCO)	Tia Simms-Lymn (JAM)	Juliana Barrett (RSA); Mary Cohen (ENG)
Team épée	Singapore	South Africa	England
Individual Sabre	Katherine Kempe (WAL)	Ann Huimin Lee (SIN)	Georgia Bruce (AUS); Danielle Hall (RSA)
Team sabre	Singapore	Scotland	England

== Medal table ==
Rank	Nation	Gold	Silver	Bronze	Total
1	Singapore (SIN)	4	4	2	10
2	England (ENG)	4	2	6	12
3	Scotland (SCO)	3	2	5	10
4	Wales (WAL)	1	2	2	5
5	South Africa (RSA)	0	1	1	2
6	Jamaica (JAM)	0	1	0	1
7	Australia (AUS)	0	0	2	2
Totals (7 entries)		12	12	18	42

== Awards ==
The event was nominated for a 2015 Scottish Thistle Award, EventScotland's Tourism Awards in recognition of the benefits to the local area of North Ayrshire. The event was part of Homecoming Scotland 2014
