= Work Club =

British marketing agency

- Industry: Marketing
- Founded: August 2007; 19 years ago
- Founders: Martin Brooks (CEO); Paddy Griffith (Strategy Partner); Andy Sandoz (Creative Partner); Jon Claydon (Chairman)
- Headquarters: London, England, United Kingdom

Work Club is a full-service Digital and Social Marketing Agency based near Borough Market in London SE1. The agency has a broad range of clients, including Adidas, Asda, Coca-Cola, Heineken International, Pernod Ricard, McLaren, General Mills, PZ Cussons, and Sony.

== History ==
Work Club was founded in August 2007 by Martin Brooks (CEO), Paddy Griffith (Strategy Partner), Andy Sandoz (Creative Partner), and Jon Claydon (Chairman) Two additional partners joined in December 2007: Ben Mooge (Creative Partner) and Lisa de Bonis (Strategy Partner). Jane McNeill (COO) joined in February 2013.

On 1 April 2013 Work Cub acquired the clients and assets of Pirata London Ltd, a digital design and production studio led by Eduardo de Felipe and Stuart Peddie. Brooks, Griffith, Sandoz, Claydon, and McNeill had previously worked together at Agency Republic, and had won Digital Agency of the Year accolades for “Campaign and Marketing” four times. Mooge and de Bonis had previously worked together at Mother Advertising.

== Clients ==
Work Club's disclosed clients are:

- Adidas
- Asda
- Coca-Cola
- Creative Spirit
- Heineken International: Strongbow Gold
- PZ Cussons: Original Source, Carex, Sanctuary and Cussons Baby
- D&AD
- General Mills: Old El Paso
- McLaren Group: F1 Racing
- Nokia: Nokia Connectors
- Pernod Ricard: Ballantine's, Royal Salute
- Sony

== Notable campaigns ==
Work Club's most notable campaigns are:

=== Carte Noire Readers ===
The Carte Noire Readers were created to appeal to Carte Noire's predominantly female audience. These coffee-break-length, Jackanory-style book readings featured desirable male actors Dominic West, Greg Wise, Dan Stevens and Joseph Fiennes.

=== McLaren 'The Race' ===
To accompany and augment live TV broadcasts Work Club designed The Race 1.0b. A software app unique to McLaren, live only when the car is on the track, delivering real-time updates and raw data from the car, the drivers and the pit. This project won the ‘best website' award at the One Show awards, NYC 2010.

=== Sharp FanLabs ===
To promote Sharp's sponsorship of the UEFA Euro 2012, Work Club built laboratories filled with Sharp technology to monitor fans' behaviour – not just what they were saying, but also what they were thinking while watching matches. The FanLabs laboratory is also accompanied by an online survey to further monitor fans.

=== Ballantine's Human API ===
Work Club created an app called "Human API" to illustrate Ballantine's strap line "leave an impression". The app accessed via Ballantine's Facebook page allowed users to comment and advise artists live as they worked on a series of projects. This project won the IAB creative showcase award 2011.
