= Walt Koken =

American musician

Walt Koken (born October 9, 1946, Columbia, Missouri) is an American claw-hammer banjo player, fiddler, and singer, who received the Nashville Old-Time String Band Association's 2016 Heritage Award. Koken was prominent in the old-time music revival during the 1960s, and continues to be a leader and mentor in the old-time music community today.

== Biography ==
=== Family ===
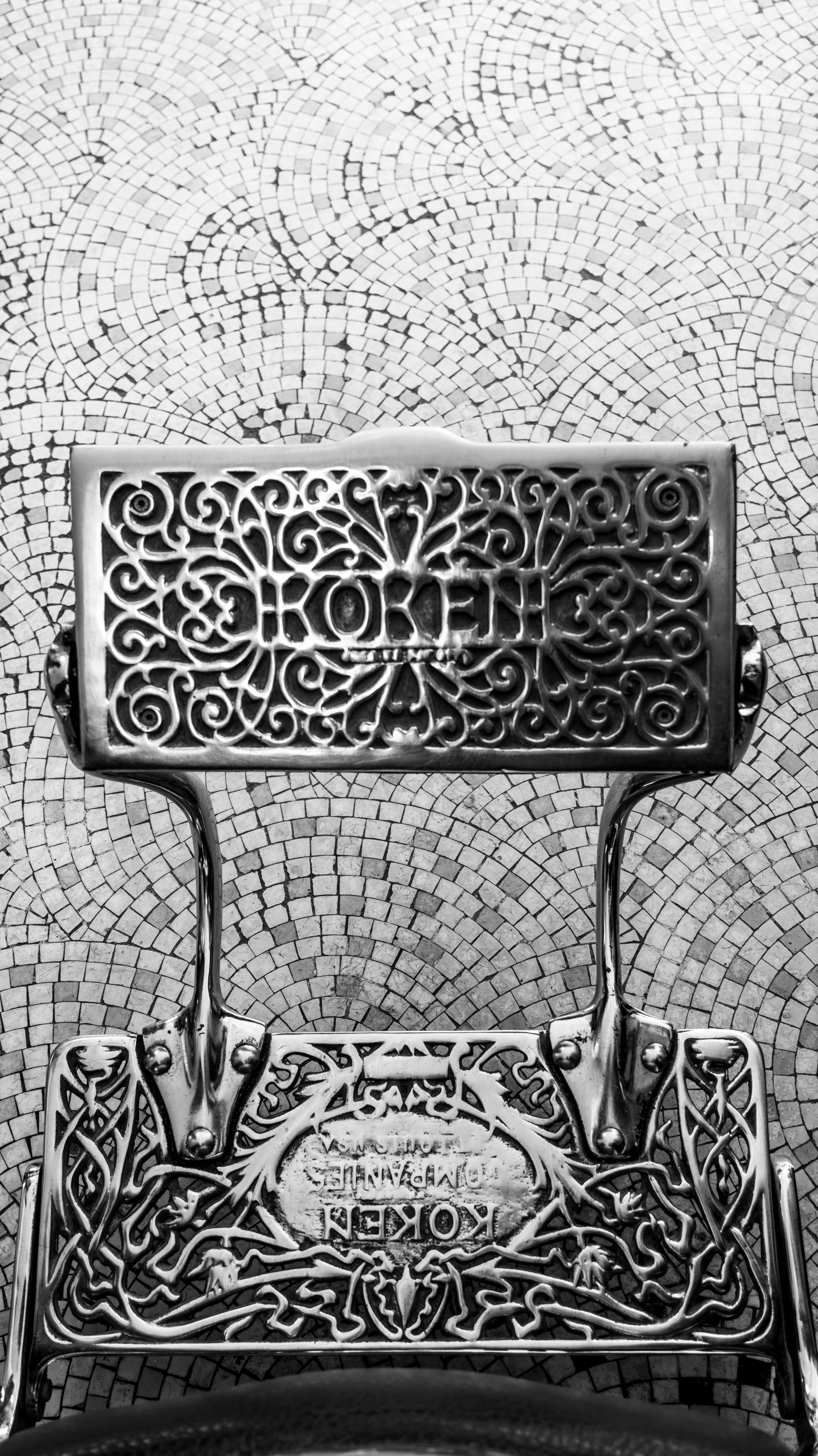
Footplate detail on a Koken barber's chair

Koken's mother, Helen Hawkins Koken Pickel, was a classical pianist and a kindergarten teacher. Her family was English; the Kokens were from Germany. Koken's father, John C. Koken, was a math professor. The Koken family arrived in New Orleans in 1850, then traveled up the Mississippi River to St. Louis (Milliner 2017). By 1892, the Koken Barber's Supply Company of St. Louis held two barber chair patents; one for the first reclining Koken chair and one for the first hydraulic lift chair (Creek). In 1915 Walter F. Koken received a patent for the first electric Barber's Chair (Patents 1917).

=== Music ===
Koken started playing banjo at the age of 13. “In 1959, my brother had broken his arm, and heard that playing guitar might be a good way to get its strength back. He got his old guitar with a warped neck and high strings, and started strummin’ it. I really thought that was neat, and one day he came to me and said, “Why don’t you get a banjo, and we’ll make some money?” (Smith 2011)

Since 1965, Koken has played in multiple bands: the Busted Toe Mudthumpers, the Muskrat Ramblers (along with French clarinetist Michel Sebastiani, who later became the Olympic coach of the USA Fencing Team), the Fat City String Band, the legendary Highwoods Stringband, and The Cacklin’ Hens and Roosters Too!. (last.fm) Currently, he plays fiddle-banjo duets with his partner Clare Milliner, as well as with Clare, Kellie Allen, Pete Peterson, and Hilary Dirlam as the old-time string band, Orpheus Supertones. In 2011, Koken and Clare completed their multi-year literary collaboration, The Milliner-Koken Collection of American Fiddle Tunes.

== Discography ==
- The Original Fat City String Band (1999)
- The Highwoods Stringband, Fire On The Mountain (1973)
- The Highwoods Stringband, Dance All Night (1975)
- The Highwoods Stringband, No. 3 Special (1977)
- The Highwoods Stringband, Feed Your Babies Onions (1994)
- Highwoods Stringband Live! (2004)
- Clare Milliner & Walt Koken, Just Tunes (2003)
- Orpheus Supertones, Bound to Have a Little Fun (2004)
- Orpheus Supertones, When the Roses Bloom in Dixieland (2006)
- Orpheus Supertones, Going to Town (2011)
- Walt Koken, Finger Lakes Ramble (1998)
- Walt Koken, Banjonique (1994)
- Walt Koken, Hei-Wa Hoedown (1995)
- Walt Koken, Sittin’ in the Catbird's Seat (2012)
- Walt Koken, Slo-Mo Banjo DVD (2016)

== Bibliography ==
- Sittin' in the Catbird's Seat - Transcriptions of Banjo Tunes from the CD, Walt Koken, Mudthumper Music, 2012.
- The Milliner-Koken Collection of American Fiddle Tunes, Clare Milliner and Walt Koken, Mudthumper Music, 2011.
