= U.S. Fencing Coaches Association =

- Abbreviation: USFCA
- Formation: 1941; 85 years ago
- Members: USFCA is a member organization of the Academie d'Armes Internationale (AAI), and a member of the National Collegiate Athletic Association (NCAA)
- President: Vincent Bradford
- Website: usfca.org

The U.S. Fencing Coaches Association (USFCA) is an association of United States fencing coaches, and was established in 1941. It is a national academy of the Academie d'Armes Internationale (AAI), the world organization of fencing masters, which has as members more than 20 nations. It is also a member of the National Collegiate Athletic Association (NCAA), and cooperates with the United States Fencing Association (USFA) in supporting the development of fencing in the United States. Since 2014 the association has been headed by Peter Burchard.

== Functions ==
One of its major functions is to increase the competency of fencing teachers by testing, certifying, and accrediting three levels: fencing instructors (qualified to teach beginners), prevosts (qualified to coach teams and to teach intermediate-level fencers), and masters (qualified to work at the highest level of national and international competitive fencing).

== Notable coaches ==
Princeton University Head Coach Michel Sebastiani was twice awarded the USFCA Schreff Sword, which the Association gives yearly to the most outstanding college fencing coach of the year as voted on by his peers. He received the award both in 1994 and 2006. The Schreff Sword is an engraved silver Glamdring broadsword resting on a red velvet cushion.

Muriel Bower was the first woman Fencing Master accredited in the United States, in 1976. Nikki Franke, an All-American while fencing for Brooklyn College and later a coach at Temple University, was named the USFCA Coach of the Year four times (in 1983, 1987, 1988 and 1991).

== Publication ==
The Swordmaster is the official publication of the USFCA.
