= Michel Sebastiani =

French fencing master

Biographical details
- Born: November 1937 (age 88–89); France
- Education: French National Institute of Sport, Expertise, and Performance (INSEP)

Playing career
- 1959-60: French National Modern Pentathlon Team
- Positions: Modern pentathlete and fencer

Coaching career (HC unless noted)
- 1963–70: Cornell University (fencing)
- 1970–71: New York University (fencing)
- 1971–77: Brooklyn College (fencing)
- 1982–2006: Princeton University (fencing)

Accomplishments and honors

Championships
- 9 Ivy League championships; 6 National Intercollegiate Women's Fencing Association (NIWFA) Championships; 6 Intercollegiate Fencing Association (IFA) National championships; 5 NCAA individual champions; 1 NIWFA individual champion

Awards
- 2x U.S. Fencing Coaches Association Schreff Award; U.S. Olympic and National Team fencing coach; U.S. Fencing Hall of Fame

Michel Sebastiani (born November 1937) is a French fencing master. He earned his Maîtrise d'Escrime degree from Ecole Superieure d’Escrime in Paris. Sebastiani then coached fencing at Cornell University, New York University, Brooklyn College, and Princeton University. He was an Olympic coach for Team USA. He twice won the U.S. Fencing Coaches Association's Schreff Award, given yearly to the most outstanding college fencing coach of the year. Sebastiani was inducted into the U.S. Fencing Hall of Fame in 2015.

== Early years ==
Sebastiani is a native of France. He grew up as a young boy in Algeria in the 1940s. His family was exiled from Algeria during its civil war, and moved to Corsica in the Mediterranean Sea.

He earned two master's degrees from the French National Institute of Sports (INSEP), a training institute and center for excellence in sports that trains elite athletes, in Paris, France. In 1957, Sebastiani earned a Master of Science degree in Health, Physical Education, and Sports from INSEP. He also graduated from the Ecole Superieure d’Escrime of INSEP, France's top fencing school, where he also earned his Maîtrise d'Escrime M.A. Fencing Master degree.

Sebastiani was a member of the French National Modern Pentathlon Team in 1959, and the French Modern Pentathlon Team for the 1960 Summer Olympic Games in Rome, Italy.

He joined the French Special Forces, and was part of a military coup meant to restore Pieds-Noirs to Algeria. Sebastiani was also an officer in the French Foreign Legion paratroopers in the West Algeria War in 1960.

A clarinet player, Sebastiani played with the Preservation Hall Jazz Band in New Orleans, Louisiana. He also played clarinet in the 1960s with banjo player Walt Koken and others in the Muskrat Ramblers Dixieland Jazz Band.

== Cornell University ==
In 1963, Sebastiani came to the United States as assistant men’s fencing coach and as head coach of the women’s fencing team at Cornell University. Coached by Sebastiani, the women's team won the National Intercollegiate Women's Fencing Association (NIWFA) National Championship in 1967, 1968, and 1969. In addition, one of his Cornell fencers also won the NIWFA individual title in 1968, and another won the NCAA men’s épée title in 1968.

== New York University ==
Sebastiani next coached fencing at New York University in 1970–71. His women's team won the 1971 National Intercollegiate Women's Fencing Association championship. Among his fencers on the team was Ruth White. As Sebastiani confidently predicted she would to The New York Times, White went on to compete for Team USA at the 1972 Munich Olympics.

== Brooklyn College ==
At Brooklyn College from 1971–77, Sebastiani was the head fencing coach of the men’s fencing team, as well as an assistant professor of Health and Physical Education at the School of Sciences. Among his fencers was Matt Israel, whom he coached to the semi-finals of the 1973 Junior World Fencing Championships.

Brooklyn College fencing team captain Stewart Weisman recalled that "The Maestro was a specimen above mere mortal men. Six feet tall with a deep Corsican accent, [he] could read and write in French, English, and Arabic. It was said he was the youngest officer in the French-Algerian War. [He] could run a marathon, do a one-armed hand stand, and perform advanced gymnastics. He was a pentathlete, who excelled in running, swimming, horseback riding, pistol shooting, and one-touch épée fencing... It was said he knew a thousand single attacks in the épée alone."

During this time he also served on the coaching staff for the United States Team at the World Fencing Championships in Buenos Aires, at which two of his Brooklyn College fencers competed. In total, he served as U.S. coach for the World Fencing Championships three times.

== Texas ==
In 1978, Sebastiani founded and headed the Sebastiani Fencing Academy in Houston, Texas, the top fencing academy in the country. He also taught and coached at Rice University in Houston.

== Princeton University ==
Starting in 1982, Sebastiani was the head fencing coach of the Princeton University men's and women's fencing teams for 25 years, through the 2005–06 season. The men were 213–89 and the women were 141–88 during that time.

The teams won nine Ivy League championships (the men in 1994–95, 1997–98, and 2000–21, and the women in 1999–2001), and six Intercollegiate Fencing Association (IFA) National championships. The men finished in the top four of the NCAA or IFA 16 times, and had 19-straight winning seasons. They had a winning record in 11 of his last 12 years. The women won two national team championships, in 1993 and 1994, winning the Mildred-Stuyvesant Trophy as champions of the National Intercollegiate Fencing Association. With that, Sebastiani became the first fencing coach to win the title at three universities, having previously won it at both Cornell University and New York University.

Sebastiani coached three NCAA individual men's champions, and one women's champion. One was Hall of Famer Soren Thompson ('05), who became an NCAA épée champion, two-time Olympian, team épée world champion, Pan American Games champion, and national champion. Another of his fencers was Maya Lawrence, who won a bronze medal in team épée at the 2012 Summer Olympics in London, and was a national champion. Thirty-six of his male fencers and 25 of his female fencers won All-America honors while fencing for him.

Sebastiani twice won the U.S. Fencing Coaches Association's Schreff Sword, given yearly to the most outstanding college fencing coach of the year as voted on by their peers, in 1994 and 2006. The Schreff Sword is an engraved silver Glamdring broadsword resting on a red velvet cushion.

Author and former Princeton fencer David Treuer wrote The Fencing Master, in which he described meeting Sebastiani, and learning to fence from him.

== US Olympic and World Fencing Championship Teams ==
Sebastiani coached the US Fencing Team at the 1984 Summer Olympics in Los Angeles. He also was the coach of the US Fencing Team three teams at World Fencing Championships through 1982.

== Princeton salle ==
In November 2001, Sebastiani opened a fencing center in Princeton, New Jersey, the Cercle D'Escrime de Princeton-Sebastiani (Sebastiani Fencing Academy), which as of 2023 had 200 members. There, he is Head Fencing Master and coaches Olympic fencers and others down to the novice level in the classic traditional French school of fencing, in foil, epee, and sabre. Gabrielle Roux, who was trained by Sebastiani, is an instructor and owner.

== Hall of Fame ==
Sebastiani was inducted into the U.S. Fencing Hall of Fame in 2015.

== See also ==
- List of USFA Hall of Fame members
