= Commonwealth Fencing Championships =

International fencing competition

The Commonwealth Fencing Championships is a fencing event held in the Commonwealth of Nations. Following the removal of fencing as a core sport within the main Commonwealth Games, the first Commonwealth Fencing Championships were held in 1974 and they have been held in the same cycle as the Commonwealth Games ever since. The Championships are managed by Commonwealth Fencing Federation.

== Hosts ==
- 1974: Ottawa (Canada)
- 1978: Glasgow (Scotland)
- 1982: Barnstaple (England)
- 1986: Cardiff (Wales)
- 1990: Manchester (England)
- 1994: Whistler (Canada)
- 1998: Shah Alam (Malaysia)
- 2002: Newcastle (Australia)
- 2006: Belfast (Northern Ireland)
- 2010: Melbourne (Australia)
- 2014: Largs (Scotland)
- 2018: Canberra (Australia)
- 2022: London (England)
- 2026: TBA (Nigeria)

== Commonwealth Champions ==
=== Foil ===
Year	Location	Men's Individual	Women's Individual	Men's Team	Women's Team
2022	(England) London	(England) Harry Bird	(England) Kate Beardmore	England	England
2018	(Australia) Canberra	(England) Ben Peggs	(Scotland) Chloe Dickson	Australia	Scotland
2014	(Scotland) Largs	(Scotland) Jamie Fitzgerald	(Singapore) Wenying Wang	England	Singapore
2010	(Australia) Melbourne	(Australia) Frank Bartolillo	(New Zealand) P Yuan	Australia	England
2006	(Northern Ireland) Belfast	(Canada) J. McGuire	(Canada) M. Kwan	Canada	Canada
2002	(Australia) Newcastle	(Australia) Frank Bartolillo	(Northern Ireland) Eloise Smith	Australia	England
1998	(Malaysia) Shah Alam	(Scotland) D. McKenzie	(England) Eloise Smith	England	England

=== Sabre ===
Year	Location	Men's Individual	Women's Individual	Men's Team	Women's Team
2022	(England) London	(England) JJ Webb	(India) Bhavani Devi	England	Australia
2018	(Australia) Canberra	(England) William Deary	(India) Bhavani Devi	India	England
2014	(Scotland) Largs	(England) Alex Crutchett	(Wales) Katherine Kempe	England	Scotland
2010	(Australia) Melbourne	(England) Alex Crutchett	(England) Joanna Hutchison	England	England

=== Epee ===
Year	Location	Men's Individual	Women's Individual	Men's Team	Women's Team
2022	(England) London	(England) Matthew Cooper	(England) Susan Maria Sica	India	Canada
2018	(Australia) Canberra	(England) Tommy C. Jones	(Canada) Leonora Mackinnon	England	England
2014	(Scotland) Largs	(England) Dudley Tredger	(Scotland) Georgina Usher	Singapore	Singapore
2010	(Australia) Melbourne	(Wales) Marc Burkhalter	(Australia) Evelyn Halls	England	Australia
