= Scottish Fencing =

Scottish Fencing is the national governing body for the Olympic sport of fencing in Scotland.
