= Ruby Watson =

African-American fencer and activist (1926–2002)

Ruby Watson (March 26, 1926 – April 2002) was a prominent figure in the sport of fencing known for her advocacy for the inclusion of women in the sport at both the U.S. National and Olympic level. She was a competitor in both épée and sabre fencing. She was born in Harlem, New York and died in Brooklyn in 2002. She was nominated to the US Fencing Association's Hall of Fame in 2025.

== Early life and education ==
Watson grew up in Harlem, New York City and studied at Hunter College. She earned a master's degree from Empire State College. She moved to Brooklyn where she spent the majority of her life and career.

== Fencing career and advocacy ==
While living in Brooklyn, Watson joined the Fencer's Club where she competed in any épée and sabre competition she could find. Later she joined Metropolis fencing. She was a fencing competitor for over 30 years. At the time, fencing was a sport dominated by men, and Watson was one of few women fencers as well as women of color. She joined the AFLA/USFA and advocated for the inclusion of women's events in épée and sabre which was met with frequent pushback and resistance.

She was a board member of the Metropolitan Division for over 35 years where she continued to push for acceptance of women in the sport of fencing. Women's sabre was added to the Olympic games in 2004, and the US Women's Sabre team won gold that same year

== Death and posthumous accolades ==
Ruby Watson struggled with cancer in her later life but still found time to advocate for women's inclusion in the sport throughout bouts of surgery and various treatments. She died of cancer in April 2002. A memorial was held for her the same month with fencers from three different generations present to celebrate her life and accomplishments. In Division I Women's Sabre, the 2023 champions received a trophy named for Watson. She was also nominated for the 2025 US Fencing Hall of Fame. Watson is remembered in the Museum of American Fencing:

Ruby Watson of the Metropolitan Division was the most formidable voice year after year for the development and inclusion of Women’s Epee and Women’s Saber in US Division 1 and Olympic events. No matter what negative press and ridicule she absorbed, regardless of consistent refusals, and no matter what illogical explanations the fencing associations of the world gave her as to why women should not have the right to fence the 2 weapons, Ruby never took no for an answer and fought for women’s fencing rights in the United States until the day she died. We all owe Ruby Watson.
