= Frank Bartolillo =

Australian fencer

Personal information
- Born: 22 December 1981 (age 44) Sydney, New South Wales, Australia

Sport
- Sport: Fencing

Frank Bartolillo (born 22 December 1981) is a profoundly deaf Australian fencer. He competed in the individual foil event at the 2004 Summer Olympics.

== See also ==
- Deaf people in the Olympics
