= C. A. Bhavani Devi =

Indian fencer

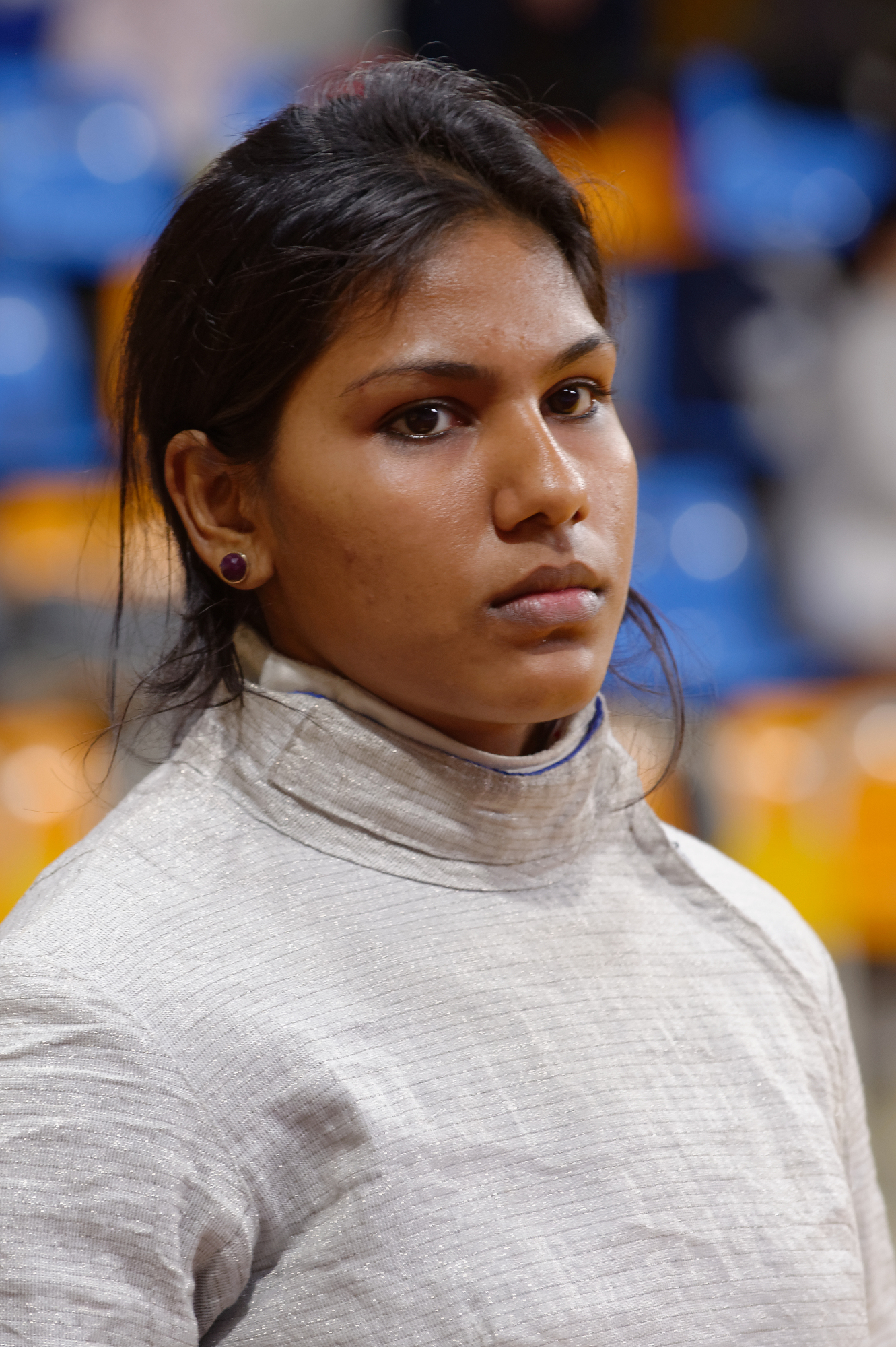

Personal information
- Full name: Chadalavada Anandha Bhavani Devi
- Nationality: Indian
- Born: 27 August 1993 (age 32) Chennai, Tamil Nadu, India
- Height: 1.68 m (5 ft 6 in)
- Weight: 58 kg (128 lb)
- Website: Website

Fencing career
- Sport: Fencing
- Weapon: Sabre
- Hand: Right-handed
- Highest ranking: 32
- Current ranking: 55
- FIE ranking: 55
- FIE profile
Medal record
Women's sabre fencing
Representing India
Asian Championships
Bronze medal – third place	2023 Wuxi	Individual
Commonwealth Championships
Gold medal – first place	2018 Canberra	Individual
Gold medal – first place	2022 London	Individual
Commonwealth Junior Championships
Silver medal – second place	2012 Jersey	Team
Bronze medal – third place	2009 Malaysia	Team
Bronze medal – third place	2012 Jersey	Individual
Asian U23 Championships
Silver medal – second place	2014 Philippines	Individual
Bronze medal – third place	2015 Mongolia	Individual
Asian U20 Championships
Bronze medal – third place	2010 Philippines	Team

Chadalavada Anandha Bhavani Devi (born 27 August 1993) is an Indian sabre fencer. She became the first Indian fencer to qualify for Olympics at the 2020 Olympic Games. She is also a double gold medalist at the Commonwealth Championships. Devi became the first Indian fencer to win a medal at the Asian Championships by winning the bronze medal at the 2023 edition.

== Early life ==
Bhavani was born in Chennai, Tamil Nadu. Her father belonged to a Telugu family from Samalkot town in East Godavari district of Andhra Pradesh who eventually moved to Chennai. She started her sports career in 2004. She did her schooling at Muruga Dhanushkodi Girls Higher Secondary, Chennai and then attended the St. Joseph's College of Engineering, Chennai and went on to complete Business Administration from Government Brennen College in Thalassery, Kerala.

In 2004, she was introduced to fencing at school level. After finishing class 10 she joined the SAI (Sports Authority of India) Centre in Thalassery, Kerala. At the age of 14 she appeared at her first international tournament in Turkey, where she got black card for being late by three minutes. At the 2010 Asian Championship in the Philippines she bagged the bronze medal.

== Tournaments and medals ==
Starting from the bronze medal at 2009 Commonwealth Championship held in Malaysia, Bhavani has won bronze medals in 2010 International Open, Thailand; 2010 Cadet Asian Championship, Philippines; 2012 Common Wealth Championship, Jersey; 2015 Under-23 Asian Championship, Ulaanbaatar, Mongolia and 2015 Flemish Open. In 2014 Asian Championship under 23 category in the Philippines she bagged the Silver medal becoming the first Indian to do so. After her successful 2014 Asian Championship Tamil Nadu Chief Minister Jayalalithaa honoured her with INR three lakh as financial aid for training in the US. In 2015, she became one of the 15 athletes selected 'Go Sports Foundation' for Rahul Dravid Athlete Mentorship Programme. She has received 2 Gold Medals, one each at the 2012 CommonWealth Championship, Jersey and the 2014 Tuscany Cup, Italy. She finished fifth in the Viking Cup 2016 Icelandic International Sabre Tournaments held at Reykjavik. She won a silver medal in the women's sabre individual category in the 2019 Tournoi Satellite Fencing Competition in Ghent, Belgium, after losing to Bashta Anna from Azerbaijan. She made history by becoming the first Indian to win a gold medal at the senior Commonwealth Fencing Championship in Canberra in the sabre event. She beat Catriona Thomson from Scotland in the semi-finals and then defeated England's Emily Ruaux. She trains in Italy as well as at the Sports Authority of India in Thalassery, Kerala.

In 2021, she competed at the Tokyo Olympics.

== Awards and rewards ==
• Arjuna Award (2021)
