= The Carte Noire Readers =

Released in July 2009, The Carte Noire Readers is a series of online Jackanory-style films promoting the French coffee brand Carte Noire. It stars British actors Dominic West, Greg Wise and Dan Stevens reading love scenes from a variety of classic and modern Penguin novels.

In March 2010 a new series was released featuring Joseph Fiennes to celebrate the launch of Carte Noire's new cappuccino product. The 10 films were released over a series of weeks, beginning with readings of Sense and Sensibility by Jane Austen, The Brightest Star in the Sky by Marian Keyes and Presumed Innocent by Scott Turow.

== Readings ==
- Pride and Prejudice by Jane Austen read by Dominic West
- Tess of the d'Urbervilles by Thomas Hardy read by Greg Wise
- Great Expectations by Charles Dickens read by Dan Stevens
- High Fidelity by Nick Hornby read by Dominic West
- A Guide to the Birds of East Africa by Nicholas Drayson read by Greg Wise
- Lady Chatterley's Lover by D. H. Lawrence read by Dominic West
- The Rotters' Club by Jonathan Coe read by Dan Stevens
- Sense and Sensibility by Jane Austen read by Joseph Fiennes
- The Brightest Star in the Sky by Marian Keyes read by Joseph Fiennes
- Presumed Innocent by Scott Turow read by Joseph Fiennes
