= Muriel Bower =

American foilist, coach, and educator

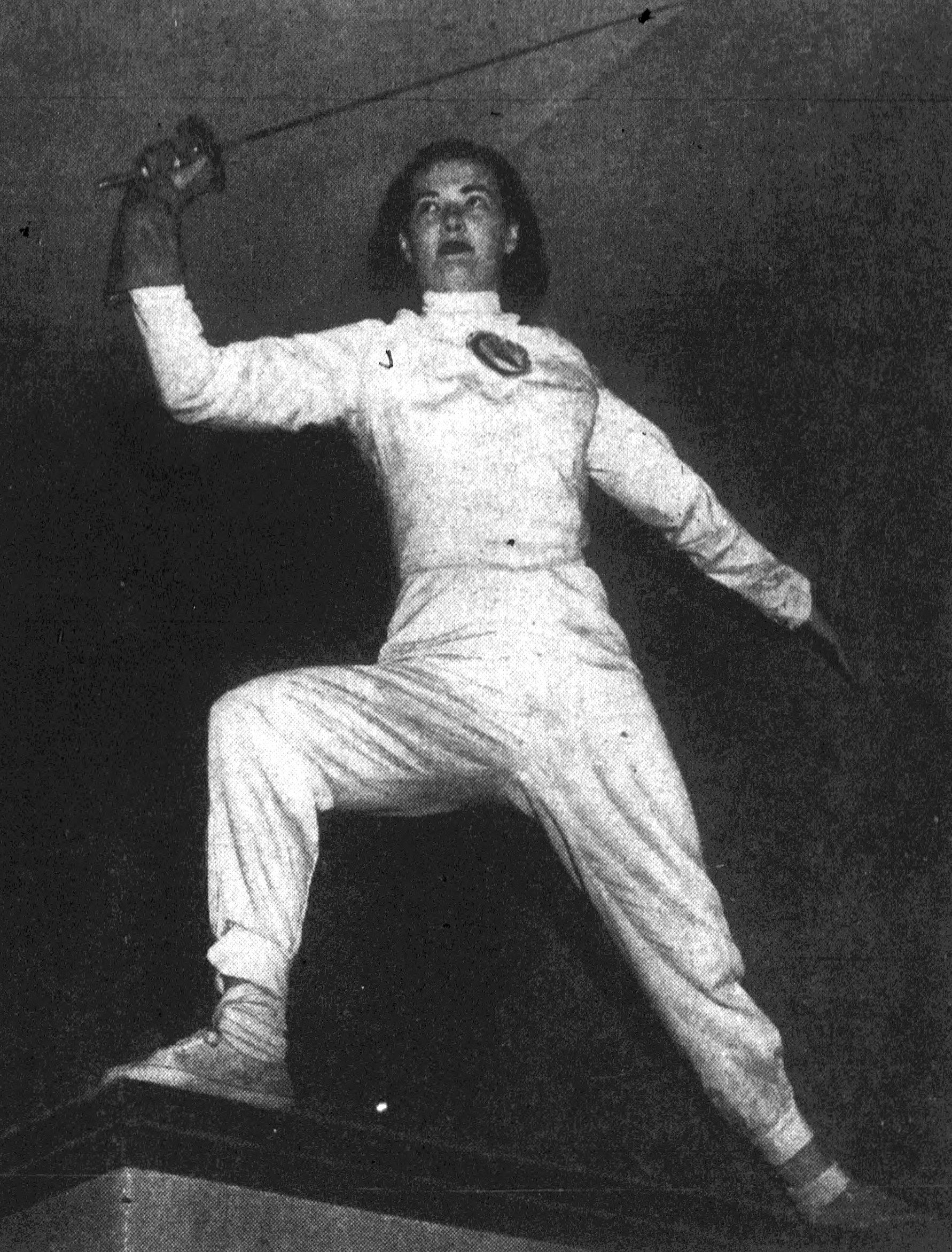
Bower, circa 1951

Muriel (Bower) Taitt is an American foilist, coach, and educator.

She is author of the foilist's classic textbook Foil Fencing, now in its 8th edition. In the second edition (1972), former F.I.E. President Miguel de Capriles identified her as "a sensational teen-age Pacific Coast champion before the war [who subsequently] returned to competition to win a well-earned No. 3 national rating. She is one of the small but bright cluster of California women who dominated the national fencing scene in those years".

She holds the distinction of having been accredited the first woman fencing master in the United States, by her fencing master, the Hungarian Istvan Danosi (b. 1912, d. 2005), USFA Hall of Fame recipient.

Her first fencing master was Henry Uyttenhove, who was Douglas Fairbank Sr.'s fencing trainer. Uyttenhove was fencing master at the Los Angeles Athletic Club, to which Fairbanks belonged. Uyttenhove was replaced by Jon Hermann, also from Belgium. Muriel was obviously Hermann's star pupil, but a serious car accident prevented her going to the 1948 Olympics (she had made the team), and she started working with Hermann as his assistant. She was going to college during this period, earning a bachelor's degree in PE at UCLA and a master's degree at USC.

In the 1970s, Muriel coached the California State University Northridge and was subsequently inducted into that University's Hall of Fame.

she was women's foil coach to the American team at the 1964 Olympic Games fencing events in Tokyo, managed the American women's fencing team at the World University Games, Russia, 1973, and served in protocol to fencing at the L.A. Olympic Games, 1984. She has subsequently served as West Coast Vice-President of the USFA Coaches Association for two terms, and also as Commissioner of Western Regional Intercollegiate Fencing Championships, USFA.
