= Commonwealth Junior Fencing Championships =

The Commonwealth Junior and Cadet Fencing Championships, for fencers under 20 years of age (Junior) or under 17 years of age (cadet), are held every three years. are managed by the Commonwealth Fencing Federation

== 2006 ==
The Championships were first held in Chennai, India from 24 January to 29 January 2006.

Fencers competed from England, Scotland, Wales, Northern Ireland, Australia, Singapore, India, New Zealand and Malaysia.

Winners for individual and team events were (in order of competition):-

24 January

Women's Sabre Individual - Christie Waddington (SCO)

25 January

Men's Foil Individual - Jozef Slowiaczek (AUS)

Women's Épée Individual - Corinna Lawrence (ENG)

26 January

Women's Foil Individual - Yu Ling Tai (SIG)

Men's Sabre Individual - Alex O'Connell (ENG)

27 January

Women's Foil Team - Australia

Men's Épée Individual - James Thornton (ENG)

28 January

Men's Épée Team - Australia

Women's Épée Team - England

Women's Sabre Team - Scotland

29 January

Men's Sabre Team - England

Men's Foil Team - Australia

== 2009 ==
The 2nd Junior Commonwealth Fencing Championships were held in Penang, Malaysia between 15 February and 21 February 2009: and was hosted by the Penang Amateur Fencing Association (PAFA).

=== Timetable ===
The timetable : for the 2009 games is as follows Venue: Penang International Sports Arena (PISA)

Sun Feb. 15

Weapon Check and DT Meeting

Mon Feb. 16

Weapon Check, Team Manager Meeting and Referee Meeting

- Winners for individual and team events were (in order of competition)

Tue Feb. 17

Opening Ceremony, Men's Épée - Joshua Koh (MAS) Women's Sabre - Kira Roberts (ENG)

Wed Feb. 18

Men's Foil - Benjamin Peggs (ENG) Women's Épée - Corrina Lawarence (ENG)

Thu Feb. 19

Men's Sabre - Alexander Crutchett (ENG) Women's Foil - Elizabeth Ng (ENG)

Fri Feb. 20

Men's Foil (Team) - England Women's Épée (Team) - England Women's Sabre (Team) - England

Sat Feb. 21

Men's Épée (Team) - Malaysia Men's Sabre (Team) - England Women's Foil (Team) - Scotland

Closing Dinner - Evergreen Laural Hotel:

== 2012 ==
The 2012 Commonwealth Junior Fencing Championships were held in Jersey.

Results - winners

Mon 13 Feb
MEN'S FOIL INDIVIDUAL- Amol Rattan (ENG)
WOMEN'S SABRE INDIVIDUAL - Aliya Itzkowitz (ENG)

Tue 14 Feb
MEN'S SABRE INDIVIDUAL - Soji Aiyenuro (ENG)
WOMEN'S EPEE INDIVIDUAL - Caitlin Chang (ENG)

Wed 15 Feb
MEN'S EPEE INDIVIDUAL - Matthew Anderson (CAN)
WOMEN'S FOIL INDIVIDUAL - Georgia Hannay (SCO)

Thurs 16 Feb
MEN'S FOIL TEAM - ENGLAND
WOMEN'S EPEE TEAM - ENGLAND
WOMEN'S SABRE TEAM - ENGLAND

Fri 17 Feb
MEN'S EPEE TEAM - ENGLAND
MEN'S SABRE TEAM - ENGLAND
WOMEN'S FOIL TEAM - SCOTLAND

== 2015 ==
Winner 2015 Men's Junior Foil - Gold Individual & Gold Team - Alexander Lloyd GBR - Club ZFW - Coach Ziemowit Wojciechowski - Held in South Africa

The 2015 Championships are due to be held in Cape Town, South Africa in July 2015, and will be the first to incorporate Cadet (under-17) events, in addition to the Juniors.

== 2018 ==
The 2018 Commonwealth Junior & Cadet Championships were held in Newcastle upon Tyne, England between 23 and 31 July

Winners

Cadet Men's Épée: Sherjin Rajendran Shantimol (IND)

Cadet Men's Foil: Lucas Sings (CAN)

Cadet Men's Sabre: Julian Richards II (ENG)

Cadet Women's Épée: Eleanor Taylor (ENG)

Cadet Women's Foil: Tianji Lukins (AUS)

Cadet Women's Sabre: Ellen Robbins-Wilkinson (ENG)

Junior Men's Épée: William East

Junior Men's Foil: Harry Bird

== 2022 ==
TBA

== 2024 ==
The 2024 Commonwealth Junior & Cadet Fencing Championships were held in Christchurch, New Zealand, between 12 and 19 July. Ngā Puna Wai Sports Hub served as the venue.

Winners:

Cadet Men's Épée: Fin BENNET (ENG)

Cadet Men's Foil: Yuntao DU (SGP)

Cadet Men's Sabre: Alexander LETTE (AUS)

Cadet Women's Épée: Reya FARLAM (ENG)

Cadet Women's Foil: Georgette SWEENEY (AUS)

Cadet Women's Sabre: Zara DJAMIRZE (AUS)

Junior Men's Épée: Raphael DEGORCE (ENG)

Junior Men's Foil: David KELLY (SCO)

Junior Men's Sabre: Wei Zuo DAN (SGP)

Junior Women's Épée: Erin PEDLER (ENG)

Junior Women's Foil: Ruby CHAN (NZL)

Junior Women's Sabre: Veronika VASILEVA (AUS)
