= Commonwealth Fencing Federation =

The Commonwealth Fencing Federation is the governing body recognised by the Commonwealth Games Federation as being responsible for the running of competitions in the sport of fencing within the Commonwealth member states. The federation was formed when fencing ceased to be a core sport within the Commonwealth Games after the 1970 event. It was previously known as the Empire Fencing Federation, which was formed in 1950.

== Tournaments ==
The Federation oversees the running of the following tournaments

- The Commonwealth Fencing Championships. Events for individuals and teams Held every 4 years in line with the main Commonwealth Games.
- The Commonwealth Junior Fencing Championships. Junior (Under 20) events for individuals and teams usually held every three years and now include the option for hosts to hold cadet (under 17) events alongside.
- The Commonwealth Veterans Fencing Championships. Veteran event for individuals and teams aged over 40 but including various age categories as defined with veterans fencing globally.

== Members ==
The following countries are recognised by the CFF as members and are able to compete at Commonwealth tournaments

- Australia
- Bangladesh
- Barbados
- Belize
- Botswana
- Brunei Darussalam
- Canada
- Cyprus
- Dominica
- England
- Ghana
- Guernsey
- India
- Isle of Man
- Jamaica
- Jersey
- Malaysia
- Malta
- Mauritius
- Namibia
- New Zealand
- Nigeria
- Northern Ireland
- Rwanda
- Samoa
- Scotland
- Sierra Leone
- Singapore
- South Africa
- Sri Lanka
- Wales

== Presidents ==
The role of president is an elected position voted for by all the member countries at congress which is held every four years in line with the Commonwealth Fencing Championships

The current president of the federation is Helen Smith (fencer) who has held the position since 2002.

Former presidents are...

- Piers Jones (between 1992 and 2002)
- Mary Glen-Haig (between 1978 and 1990)
- J.Emyrs Lloyd (between 1974 and 1978)
