= India at the 2019 South Asian Games =

- IOC code: IND
- NOC: Indian Olympic Association

in Kathmandu and Pokhara, Nepal 1–10 December 2019
- Competitors: 487 in 22 sports
- Flag bearer: Tajinderpal Singh Toor
- Medals Ranked 1st: Gold 175 Silver 92 Bronze 45 Total 312

South Asian Games appearances (overview)
- 1984; 1985; 1987; 1989; 1991; 1993; 1995; 1999; 2004; 2006; 2010; 2016; 2019; 2025

India competed at the 2019 South Asian Games in Kathmandu and Pokhara, Nepal from 1 to 10 December 2019. A total of 487 athletes participated in the games across 22 sports. Tajinderpal Singh Toor was the flag bearer at the opening ceremony of the event. India finished at the top of the medal tally with 175 gold, 92 silver and 45 bronze.

== Medalists ==
| Medal | Name | Sport | Event | Date |
|---|---|---|---|---|
| Gold | Gaurav Singh; Harsha Singha | Taekwondo | Pair poomsae | 2 December |
| Gold | Lalthlamunapuia Lalfakzuala; Daniel Lahumthanga | Taekwondo | Men's team poomsae | 2 December |
| Gold | India national badminton team | Badminton | Men's team | 2 December |
| Gold | India national badminton team | Badminton | Women's team | 2 December |
| Gold | Adarsha M .N. Sinimol | Triathlon | Men | 2 December |
| Gold | Kashish Malik | Taekwondo | Women's 57 kg | 3 December |
| Gold | Ajay Kumar Saroj | Athletics | Men's 1500m | 3 December |
| Gold | Sarvesh Anil Kushare | Athletics | Men's High Jump | 3 December |
| Gold | Archana Suseendran | Athletics | Women's 100m | 3 December |
| Gold | Jishna M | Athletics | Women's High Jump | 3 December |
| Gold | Mehuli Ghosh | Shooting | 10 Meter Air Rifle Women | 3 December |
| Gold | Mehuli Ghosh; Shriyanka Sadangi; Shreya Agarwal | Shooting | 10 Meter Air Rifle Women Team | 3 December |
| Gold | Chain Singh | Shooting | 50 Meter Rifle 3P Men | 3 December |
| Gold | Yogesh Singh | Shooting | 25 Meter Center Fire Pistol Men | 3 December |
| Gold | India men's national volleyball team | Volleyball | Men's Team | 3 December |
| Gold | India women's national volleyball team | Volleyball | Women's Team | 3 December |
| Gold | | Table Tennis | Men's Team | 3 December |
| Gold | | Table Tennis | Women's Team | 3 December |
| Gold | Pragnya Mohan M S Adarsh Sorojini Devi Thoudam Bishworjit Saikhom | Triathlon | Mixed Team | 4 December |
| Gold | India Davis Cup team | Tennis | Men's Team | 4 December |
| Gold | India Fed Cup team | Tennis | Women's Team | 4 December |
| Gold | | Kho-Kho | Men's Team | 4 December |
| Gold | | Kho-Kho | Women's Team | 4 December |
| Gold | Suresh Kumar | Athletics | Men's 10000 m | 4 December |
| Gold | Kripal Singh | Athletics | Men's Discus Throw | 4 December |
| Gold | Archana Suseendran | Athletics | Women's 200 m | 4 December |
| Gold | Lokesh Sathyanathan | Athletics | Men's Long Jump | 4 December |
| Gold | Navjeet Dhillon | Athletics | Women's Discus Throw | 4 December |
| Gold | Annu Raj Singh | Shooting | 25 Meter Pistol Women | 4 December |
| Gold | Annu Raj Singh; Gauri Sheoran; Neeraj Kaur | Shooting | 25 Meter Pistol Women Team | 4 December |
| Gold | Sreeja Akula Madhurika Patkar | Table Tennis | Women's Doubles | 4 December |
| Gold | Harmeet Desai Anthony Amalraj | Table Tennis | Men's Doubles | 4 December |
| Gold | Harmeet Desai Sutirtha Mukherjee | Table Tennis | Mixed Doubles | 4 December |
| Gold | Rodali Baruwa | Taekwondo | Women's 73+ kg | 4 December |
| Gold | Latika Bhandari | Taekwondo | Women's 53 kg | 4 December |
| Gold | Jarnel Singh | Taekwondo | Men's 74 kg | 4 December |
| Gold | Suraj Singh | Wushu | Gunshu All Round | 5 December |
| Gold | Karthik Unnikrishnan | Athletics | Men's Triple Jump | 5 December |
| Gold | Jhilli Dalabehera | Weightlifting | Women's 45 kg | 5 December |
| Gold | Sneha Soren | Weightlifting | Women's 49 kg | 5 December |
| Gold | Sorokhaibam Bindyarani Devi | Weightlifting | Women's 55 kg | 5 December |
| Gold | Siddhant Gogoi | Weightlifting | Men's 61 kg | 5 December |
| Gold | Purva Dattary Dixit | Taekwondo | Women's 49 kg | 5 December |
| Gold | Ruchika Bhave | Taekwondo | Women's 67 kg | 5 December |
| Gold | Margaret Maria | Taekwondo | Women's 73 kg | 5 December |
| Gold | Pankaj Kumar | Shooting | Men's 10m Air Rifle Team | 5 December |
| Gold | Yash Vardhan Ankush Jadhav Pankaj Kumar | Shooting | Men's 10m Air Rifle Team | 5 December |
| Gold | Y Sanathoi Devi | Wushu | Women's Sansou 52 kg | 5 December |
| Gold | Roshibina Devi | Wushu | Women's Sanda 60 kg | 5 December |
| Gold | Sushila | Wushu | Women's Sanda 65 kg | 5 December |
| Gold | Deepika | Wushu | Women's Sanda 70 kg | 5 December |
| Gold | Punam | Wushu | Women's Sanda 75 kg | 5 December |
| Gold | Sunil Singh | Wushu | Men's Sanda 52 kg | 5 December |
| Gold | Uchit Singh | Wushu | Men's Sanda 56 kg | 5 December |
| Gold | Bikrant Baliyan | Wushu | Men's Sanda 60 kg | 5 December |
| Gold | Ravi Panchal | Wushu | Men's Sanda 65 kg | 5 December |
| Gold | Suraj Yadav | Wushu | Men's Sanda 70 kg | 5 December |
| Gold | Likith Selvaraj Prema | Swimming | Men's 200m Breaststroke (SC) | 5 December |
| Gold | Apeksha Delyla Fernandes | Swimming | Women's 200m Breaststroke (SC) | 5 December |
| Gold | Divya Satija | Swimming | Women's 100m Butterfly (SC) | 5 December |
| Gold | Annie Jain; Maana Patel; Divya Satija; Shivangi Sarma | Swimming | Women's 4 × 100 m Freestyle Relay(SC) | 5 December |
| Gold | Tejinder Pal Singh Toor | Athletics | Men's ShotPut | 6 December |
| Gold | Abha Khatuwa | Athletics | Women's ShotPut | 6 December |
| Gold | Achinta Sheuli | Weightlifting | Men's 73 kg | 6 December |
| Gold | Rakhi Halder | Weightlifting | Women's 64 kg | 6 December |
| Gold | Manpreet Kaur | Weightlifting | Women's 71 kg | 6 December |
| Gold | John Naveen Thomas | Cycling | Men's Elite Time trial | 6 December |
| Gold | Elangbam Chaoba Devi | Cycling | Women's Elite Time trial | 6 December |
| Gold | Anthony Amalraj | Table Tennis | Men's Singles | 6 December |
| Gold | Sutirtha Mukherjee | Table Tennis | Women's Singles | 6 December |
| Gold | Karan Singh | Fencing | Men's Sabre | 6 December |
| Gold | Sunil Kumar | Fencing | Men's Épée | 6 December |
| Gold | Wangelmbam Thoibi Devi | Fencing | Women's Foil | 6 December |
| Gold | Annu Raj Singh Shri Nivetha Parmanathan Esha Singh | Shooting | Women's 10m Air Pistol Team | 6 December |
| Gold | Shri Nivetha Parmanathan | Shooting | Women's 10m Air Pistol | 6 December |
| Gold | Kushagra Rawat | Swimming | Men's 1500m Freestyle (SC) | 6 December |
| Gold | Richa Mishra | Swimming | Women's 400m Individual Medley(SC) | 6 December |
| Gold | Srihari Nataraj | Swimming | Men's 200m Backstroke(SC) | 6 December |
| Gold | Likith Selvaraj Prema | Swimming | Men's 100m Breaststroke(SC) | 6 December |
| Gold | Annie Jain | Swimming | Women's 100m Breaststroke(SC) | 6 December |
| Gold | Rahul Kumar | Wrestling | Men's 57 kg | 6 December |
| Gold | Amit Dahiya | Wrestling | Men's 65 kg | 6 December |
| Gold | Sheetal Tomar | Wrestling | Women's 50 kg | 6 December |
| Gold | Pinki | Wrestling | Women's 53 kg | 6 December |
| Gold | Siril Verma | Badminton | Men's Singles | 6 December |
| Gold | Ashmita Chaliha | Badminton | Women's Singles | 6 December |
| Gold | Dhruv Kapila Krishna Prasad Garaga | Badminton | Men's Doubles | 6 December |
| Gold | Dhruv Kapila Meghana Jakkampudi | Badminton | Mixed Doubles | 6 December |
| Gold | Satyawart Kadian | Wrestling | Men's 97 kg | 7 December |
| Gold | Sumit Malik | Wrestling | Men's 125 kg | 7 December |
| Gold | Sarita Mor | Wrestling | Women's 57 kg | 7 December |
| Gold | Gursharanpreet Kaur | Wrestling | Women's 76 kg | 7 December |
| Gold | Sharsti Singh | Weightlifting | Women's 81 kg | 7 December |
| Gold | Anuradha Pavnuraj | Weightlifting | Women's 87 kg | 7 December |
| Gold | Richa Mishra | Swimming | Women's 800m Freestyle(SC) | 7 December |
| Gold | Siva Sridhar | Swimming | Men's 400m Individual Medley(SC) | 7 December |
| Gold | Maana Patel | Swimming | Women's 100m Backstroke(SC) | 7 December |
| Gold | Srihari Nataraj | Swimming | Men's 100m Backstroke(SC) | 7 December |
| Gold | Chahat Arora | Swimming | Women's 50m Backstroke(SC) | 7 December |
| Gold | Likith Selvaraj Prema | Swimming | Men's 50m Breastroke(SC) | 7 December |
| Gold | Rujuta Khade | Swimming | Women's 50m Freestyle(SC) | 7 December |
| Gold | Anish Bhanwala | Shooting | Men's 25m Rapid Fire Pistol | 7 December |
| Gold | Anish Bhanwala; Bhabesh Shekhawat; Adarsh Singh | Shooting | Men's 25m Rapid Fire Pistol Team | 7 December |
| Gold | Mehuli Ghosh; Yash vardhan | Shooting | 10m Rifle Mixed Team | 7 December |
| Gold | Vinoth Kumar | Fencing | Men's Foil | 7 December |
| Gold | Devi Thoudam Kabita | Fencing | Women's Épée | 7 December |
| Gold | Sonali Chanu | Cycling | Women's Individual Road Race | 7 December |
| Gold | Satbir Singh | Cycling | Men's Individual Road Race | 7 December |
| Gold | | Fencing | Men's Sabre Team | 8 December |
| Gold | | Fencing | Men's Épée Team | 8 December |
| Gold | | Fencing | Women's Foil Team | 8 December |
| Gold | Shravan Kumar | Shooting | Men's 10m Air Pistol | 8 December |
| Gold | Shravan Kumar; Sumit Raman; Ravinder Singh | Shooting | Men's 10m Air Pistol Team | 8 December |
| Gold | India women's national handball team | Handball | Women's Handball | 8 December |
| Gold | Shushila Likmabam | Judo | Women's 48 kg | 8 December |
| Gold | Suchika Tariyal | Judo | Women's 57 kg | 8 December |
| Gold | Laishram Nirupama Devi | Judo | Women's 63 kg | 8 December |
| Gold | Vijay Kumar Yadav | Judo | Men's 60 kg | 8 December |
| Gold | Jasleen Singh Saini | Judo | Men's 66 kg | 8 December |
| Gold | Tanvi Khanna | Squash | Women's Singles | 8 December |
| Gold | Kushagra Rawat | Swimming | Men's 400m Freestyle (SC) | 8 December |
| Gold | Supriya Mondal | Swimming | Men's 200m Butterfly (SC) | 8 December |
| Gold | Apeksha Delyla Fernandes | Swimming | Women's 200m Butterfly (SC) | 8 December |
| Gold | Maana Patel | Swimming | Women's 50m Backstroke (SC) | 8 December |
| Gold | Srihari Nataraj | Swimming | Men's 50m Backstroke (SC) | 8 December |
| Gold | | Swimming | Women's 4 × 200 m Freestyle Relay(SC) | 8 December |
| Gold | | Swimming | Men's 4 × 200 m Freestyle Relay(SC) | 8 December |
| Gold | Ravinder | Wrestling | Men's 61 kg | 8 December |
| Gold | Pawan Kumar | Wrestling | Men's 86 kg | 8 December |
| Gold | Anshu | Wrestling | Men's 59 kg | 8 December |
| Gold | Sakshi Malik | Wrestling | Men's 62 kg | 8 December |
| Gold | Saketh Myneni; Vishnu Vardhan | Tennis | Men's Doubles | 8 December |
| Gold | Prerna Bhambri; Prarthana Thombare | Tennis | Women's Doubles | 8 December |
| Gold | Sriram Balaji; Sowjanya Bavisetti | Tennis | Mixed Doubles | 8 December |
| Gold | Gaurav Baliyan | Wrestling | Men's 74 kg | 9 December |
| Gold | Anita Sheoran | Wrestling | Women's 68 kg | 9 December |
| Gold | Manish Sureshkumar | Tennis | Men's Singles | 9 December |
| Gold | Sathwika Sama | Tennis | Women's Singles | 9 December |
| Gold | Annu Raj Singh; Shravan Kumar | Shooting | 10m Air Pistol Mixed Team | 9 December |
| Gold | India women's national football team | Football | Women's Football | 9 December |
| Gold | India national 3x3 team | Basketball | Men's 3x3 Basketball | 9 December |
| Gold | India women's national 3x3 team | Basketball | Women's 3x3 Basketball | 9 December |
| Gold | | Fencing | Women's Épée Team | 9 December |
| Gold | | Fencing | Women's Sabre Team | 9 December |
| Gold | | Fencing | Men's Foil Team | 9 December |
| Gold | India women's national kabaddi team | Kabaddi | Women's Kabaddi | 9 December |
| Gold | India national kabaddi team | Kabaddi | Men's Kabaddi | 9 December |
| Gold | Anmoldeep Singh | Judo | Men's 81 kg | 9 December |
| Gold | Parmod Kumar | Judo | Men's 90 kg | 9 December |
| Gold | Garima Chaudhary | Judo | Women's 70 kg | 9 December |
| Gold | Tulika Maan | Judo | Women's 78 kg+ | 9 December |
| Gold | Richa Mishra | Swimming | Women's 200m Individual Medley (SC) | 9 December |
| Gold | Divya Satija | Swimming | Women's 50m Butterfly (SC) | 9 December |
| Gold | Srihari Nataraj; Likith Selvaraj Prema; Mihir Ambre; Virdhawal Khade | Swimming | Men's 4 × 100 m Medley Relay(SC) | 9 December |
| Gold | Maana Patel; Chahat Arora; Divya Satija; Shivangi Sarma | Swimming | Women's 4 × 100 m Medley Relay(SC) | 9 December |
| Gold | Vinod Tanwar | Boxing | Men's Light Flyweight 49 kg | 9 December |
| Gold | Sachin Siwach | Boxing | Men's Bantamweight 56 kg | 9 December |
| Gold | Ankit Khatana | Boxing | Men's Middleweight 75 kg | 9 December |
| Gold | Gaurav Chauhan | Boxing | Men's Heavyweight 91 kg | 9 December |
| Gold | Sangita Sunar | Boxing | Women's Lightweight 60 kg | 9 December |
| Gold | Kalaivani Srinivasan | Boxing | Women's Light Flyweight 48 kg | 9 December |
| Gold | Pinki Rani | Boxing | Women's Flyweight 51 kg | 10 December |
| Gold | Sonia Lather | Boxing | Women's Featherweight 57 kg | 10 December |
| Gold | Manju Bamboriya | Boxing | Women's Light Welterweight 64 kg | 10 December |
| Gold | Sparsh Kumar | Boxing | Men's Flyweight 52 kg | 10 December |
| Gold | Vikas Krishan Yadav | Boxing | Men's Welterweight 69 kg | 10 December |
| Gold | Narender | Boxing | Men's Super Heavyweight 91 kg+ | 10 December |
| Gold | Tanvi Khanna; Sunayna Kuruvilla; Sanya Vats; Urwashi Joshi | Squash | Women's Team | 10 December |
| Gold | India women's national basketball team | Basketball | Women's Team | 10 December |
| Gold | India national basketball team | Basketball | Men's Team | 10 December |
| Silver | Shilpa Thapa and Kunnal Kumar | Taekwondo | Pair Poomsae (17-23 Years) | 2 December |
| Silver | Rahul Jain | Taekwondo | Men's Individual Poomsae (23-29 Years) | 2 December |
| Silver | Rupa Bayor | Taekwondo | Female Individual Poomsae (17-23 Years) | 2 December |
| Silver | Prajakta Ankoleka | Taekwondo | Women's Individual Poomsae 29 Years above | 2 December |
| Silver | Mamata Kuamri Shah Shilpa Thapa Geeta Yadav | Taekwondo | Women's Team Poomsae (17-23 Years) | 2 December |
| Silver | Ranjit Kumar Soyam Chiglemba Singh Laishram Dingku Singh | Taekwondo | MEN'S TEAM POOMSAE 23 YEARS ABOVE | 2 December |
| Silver | Bishworjit Srikhom | Triathlon | Men | 2 December |
| Silver | Ajeet Kumar | Athletics | Men's 1500m | 3 December |
| Silver | Kavita Yadav | Athletics | Women's 10000m | 3 December |
| Silver | Chetan Balasubramanyam | Athletics | Men's High Jump | 3 December |
| Silver | Rubina Yadav | Athletics | Women's High Jump | 3 December |
| Silver | Akhil Sheoran | Shooting | Men's 50m Rifle 3P | 3 December |
| Silver | Shriyanka Sadangi | Shooting | Women's 10m Rifle | 3 December |
| Silver | Gurpreet Singh | Shooting | 25 Meter Center Fire Pistol Men | 3 December |
| Silver | Thoudam Sorojini Devi | Triathlon | Women | 3 December |
| Silver | Gyandash Singh | Wushu | TAOLU TAIJI JIAN | 4 December |
| Silver | Sajan Lama | Wushu | TAOLU NAN QUAN ALL ROUNDER | 4 December |
| Silver | Gagandeep Singh | Athletics | Men's Discus Throw | 4 December |
| Silver | Gaganjot Gill | Taekwondo | Women's 62 kg | 4 December |
| Silver | Swamynathan | Athletics | Men's Long Jump | 4 December |
| Silver | Survi Biswas | Athletics | Women's Discus Throw | 4 December |
| Silver | Gauri Sheoran | Shooting | 25 Meter Pistol Women | 4 December |
| Silver | Sutirtha Mukherjee Ayhika Mukherjee | Table Tennis | Women's Doubles | 4 December |
| Silver | Anthony Amalraj Ayhika Mukherjee | Table Tennis | Mixed Doubles | 4 December |
| Silver | Sanil Shetty Sudhanshu Grover | Table Tennis | Men's Doubles | 4 December |
| Silver | Surendhar Jayak | Athletics | Men's 110m Hurdles | 5 December |
| Silver | Aparna Roy | Athletics | Women's 110m Hurdles | 5 December |
| Silver | Mohammed Salahuddin | Athletics | Men's Triple Jump | 5 December |
| Silver | Priya H. Mohan | Athletics | Women's 400m | 5 December |
| Silver | Niraj Choudhary | Taekwondo | Men's 58 kg | 5 December |
| Silver | Akshay Hooda | Taekwondo | Men's 87 kg | 5 December |
| Silver | Ankush Jadhav | Shooting | Men's 10m Air Rifle | 5 December |
| Silver | Kushagra Rawat | Swimming | Men's 200m Freestyle (SC) | 5 December |
| Silver | Shivangi Sarma | Swimming | Women's 200m Freestyle (SC) | 5 December |
| Silver | Danush Suresh | Swimming | Men's 200m Breaststroke (SC) | 5 December |
| Silver | Mihir Ambre | Swimming | Men's 100m Butterfly (SC) | 5 December |
| Silver | Apeksha Fernandes | Swimming | Women's 100m Butterfly (SC) | 5 December |
| Silver | Srihari Nataraj; Viraj Prabhu; Anand Shylaja; Virdhawal Khade | Swimming | Men's 4 × 100 m Freestyle (SC) | 5 December |
| Silver | Nabin | Wushu | Men's 80 kg | 5 December |
| Silver | M. P. Jabir | Athletics | Men's 400 m Hurdles | 6 December |
| Silver | Sunil Dawar | Athletics | Men's 5000 m | 6 December |
| Silver | Parul Chaudhary | Athletics | Women's 5000 m | 6 December |
| Silver | Om Prakash Karhana | Athletics | Men's Shot Put | 6 December |
| Silver | Harjit Singh; Gurindervir Singh; Pranav Kalappur; Amiya Kumar Mallick | Athletics | Men's 4 × 100 m Relay | 6 December |
| Silver | Himashree Roy; Chandralekha An; Archana Suseendran; Daneshwari Ashok | Athletics | Women's 4 × 100 m Relay | 6 December |
| Silver | Arvind Panwar | Cycling | Men's Elite Time trial | 6 December |
| Silver | Harmeet Desai | Table Tennis | Men's Singles | 6 December |
| Silver | Ayhika Mukherjee | Table Tennis | Women's Singles | 6 December |
| Silver | Radhika Prakash Awati | Fencing | Women's Foil | 6 December |
| Silver | Kumreshan Padam Gisonidhi | Fencing | Men's Sabre | 6 December |
| Silver | Jayaprakash Guruprakash Copra | Fencing | Men's Épée | 6 December |
| Silver | Apeksha Fernandes | Swimming | Women's 400m Individual Medley (SC) | 6 December |
| Silver | Maana Patel | Swimming | Women's 200m Backstroke | 6 December |
| Silver | Danush Suresh | Swimming | Men's 100m Breaststroke (SC) | 6 December |
| Silver | Chahat Arora | Swimming | Women's 100m Breaststroke (SC) | 6 December |
| Silver | Virdhawal Khade | Swimming | Men's 50m Freestyle(SC) | 6 December |
| Silver | Ajay Singh | Weightlifting | Men's 81 kg | 6 December |
| Silver | Aryaman Tandon | Badminton | Men's Singles | 6 December |
| Silver | Gayathri Gopichand | Badminton | Women's Singles | 6 December |
| Silver | Shivpal Singh | Athletics | Men's Javelin Throw | 7 December |
| Silver | M. P. Jabir; Santosh Kumar; K. S. Jeevan; Angrej Singh | Athletics | Men's 4 × 400 m Relay | 7 December |
| Silver | Rashpal Singh | Athletics | Men's Marathon | 7 December |
| Silver | Mohammed Afsal | Athletics | Men's 800m | 7 December |
| Silver | A V Jayaveena | Swimming | Women's 50m Breaststroke(SC) | 7 December |
| Silver | Rajeshor Singh | Fencing | Men's Foil | 7 December |
| Silver | Sheetal Dalal | Fencing | Women's Épée | 7 December |
| Silver | Swasti Singh | Cycling | Women's Individual Road Race | 7 December |
| Silver | India men's national handball team | Handball | Men's Handball | 8 December |
| Silver | Gayatri Tokas | Judo | Women's 52 kg | 8 December |
| Silver | Sunayna Kuruvilla | Squash | Women's Singles | 8 December |
| Silver | Harinder Pal Sandhu | Squash | Men's Singles | 8 December |
| Silver | Anand Shylaja | Swimming | Men's 400m Freestyle (SC) | 8 December |
| Silver | Shivangi Sarma | Swimming | Women's 400m Freestyle (SC) | 8 December |
| Silver | Sriram Balaji; Jeevan Nedunchezhiyan | Tennis | Men's Doubles | 8 December |
| Silver | Sravya Shivani; Bhuvana Kalava | Tennis | Women's Doubles | 8 December |
| Silver | Jeevan Nedunchezhiyan; Prarthana Thombare | Tennis | Mixed Doubles | 8 December |
| Silver | Saketh Myneni | Tennis | Men's Singles | 9 December |
| Silver | Sowjanya Bavisetti | Tennis | Women's Singles | 9 December |
| Silver | Srihari Nataraj | Swimming | Men's 100m Freestyle (SC) | 9 December |
| Silver | Shivangi Sarma | Swimming | Women's 100m Freestyle (SC) | 9 December |
| Silver | Virdhawal Khade | Swimming | Men's 50m Butterfly(SC) | 9 December |
| Silver | Nina Venkatesh | Swimming | Women's 50m Butterfly(SC) | 9 December |
| Silver | Manish Kaushik | Boxing | Men's 64 kg | 9 December |
| Silver | Shiksha | Boxing | Women's 54 kg | 9 December |
| Silver | Navneet Kaur | Judo | Women's 78 kg | 9 December |
| Silver | Ajay | Judo | Men's 100 kg | 9 December |
| Silver | Surender | Judo | Men's 100 kg+ | 9 December |
| Silver | Harinder Pal Sandhu; Abhay Singh; Abhishek Dhruva Pradhan; Abhishek Agarwal | Squash | Men's Team | 10 December |
| Silver | Varinder Singh | Boxing | Men's Lightweight 60 kg | 10 December |
| Bronze | Gangphung | Taekwondo | MEN'S INDIVIDUAL POOMSAE 29 YEARS ABOVE | 2 December |
| Bronze | Harsha Singha | Taekwondo | WOMEN'S INDIVIDUAL POOMSAE (23-29) YEARS | 2 December |
| Bronze | Prithvi Raj Chouhan | Taekwondo | Men's 68 kg | 3 December |
| Bronze | Kanha Mainali | Taekwondo | Men's 54 kg | 3 December |
| Bronze | Radha Bhati | Taekwondo | Women's 46 kg | 3 December |
| Bronze | Pragnya Mohan | Triathlon | Women | 3 December |
| Bronze | P. U. Chitra | Athletics | Women's 1500m | 3 December |
| Bronze | Anjul Namdeo | Wushu | CHAN QUAN THAULO | 3 December |
| Bronze | Shreya Agrawal | Shooting | 10m Air Rifle Women | 3 December |
| Bronze | Yashodhara Madhukar Sherkar | Cycling | Women's Downhill Cycling Individual | 4 December |
| Bronze | Chandralekha An | Athletics | Women's 200m | 4 December |
| Bronze | Sandra Babu | Athletics | Women's Long Jump | 4 December |
| Bronze | Chaitanya Vijaya | Taekwondo | Men's 87 kg + | 4 December |
| Bronze | K. S. Jeevan | Athletics | Men's 400m | 5 December |
| Bronze | Bhairabi Roy | Athletics | Women's Triple Jump | 5 December |
| Bronze | Pranita Soman | Cycling | Women's Cross Country | 5 December |
| Bronze | Lakshya | Taekwondo | Men's 80 kg | 5 December |
| Bronze | O Bidyapati Chanu | Wushu | Women's Sansou 56 kg | 5 December |
| Bronze | Anand Shylaja | Swimming | Men's 200m Freestyle(SC) | 5 December |
| Bronze | Prabhat Jogi | Wushu | Men's 75 kg | 5 December |
| Bronze | Santosh Kumar | Athletics | Men's 400m Hurdles | 6 December |
| Bronze | Veerpal Kaur | Athletics | Women's 400m Hurdles | 6 December |
| Bronze | Priti Lamba | Athletics | Women's 5000m | 6 December |
| Bronze | Kachnar Chaudhary | Athletics | Women's Shot Put | 6 December |
| Bronze | Sikki Reddy; Meghana Jakkampudi | Badminton | Women's Doubles | 6 December |
| Bronze | Kuhoo Garg; Anoushka Parikh | Badminton | Women's Doubles | 6 December |
| Bronze | Lily Das | Athletics | Women's 800m | 7 December |
| Bronze | Jyoti Gawate | Athletics | Women's Marathon | 7 December |
| Bronze | Shre Singh | Athletics | Men's Marathon | 7 December |
| Bronze | Kumari Sharmila | Athletics | Women's Javelin Throw | 7 December |
| Bronze | Ridhima Veerendrakumar | Swimming | Women's 100m Backstroke(SC) | 7 December |
| Bronze | Thingujam Diana Devi | Fencing | Women's Sabre | 7 December |
| Bronze | Bhabesh Shekhawat | Shooting | Men's 25m Rapid Fire Pistol | 7 December |
| Bronze | | Athletics | Women's 4 × 400 m Relay | 7 December |
| Bronze | Ravinder Singh | Shooting | Men's 10m Air Pistol | 8 December |
| Bronze | Vishal Ruhil | Judo | Men's 73 kg | 8 December |
| Bronze | Abhay Singh | Squash | Men's Singles | 8 December |
| Bronze | Mihir Ambre | Swimming | Men's 200m Butterfly (SC) | 8 December |
| Bronze | Ridhima Veerendrakumar | Swimming | Women's 50m Backstroke (SC) | 8 December |
| Bronze | Srihari Nataraj | Swimming | Men's 200m Individual Medley(SC) | 9 December |
| Bronze | Annie Jain | Swimming | Women's 100m Freestyle (SC) | 9 December |
| Bronze | Sachin Kumar | Boxing | Men's 81 kg | 9 December |

== Medals by sports ==
| Games | 1st place, gold medalist(s) | 2nd place, silver medalist(s) | 3rd place, bronze medalist(s) | Total |
|---|---|---|---|---|
| Athletics | 13 | 20 | 15 | 48 |
| Badminton | 6 | 2 | 2 | 10 |
| Basketball | 2 | 0 | 0 | 2 |
| 3x3 Basketball | 2 | 0 | 0 | 2 |
| Boxing | 12 | 3 | 1 | 16 |
| Cycling | 4 | 2 | 2 | 8 |
| Fencing | 11 | 5 | 1 | 17 |
| Football | 1 | 0 | 0 | 1 |
| Handball | 1 | 1 | 0 | 2 |
| Judo | 10 | 4 | 1 | 15 |
| Kabaddi | 2 | 0 | 0 | 2 |
| Kho kho | 2 | 0 | 0 | 2 |
| Shooting | 18 | 7 | 4 | 29 |
| Squash | 2 | 3 | 1 | 6 |
| Swimming | 27 | 19 | 6 | 52 |
| Table Tennis | 7 | 5 | 0 | 12 |
| Taekwondo | 9 | 10 | 8 | 27 |
| Tennis | 7 | 5 | 0 | 12 |
| Triathlon | 2 | 2 | 1 | 5 |
| Volleyball | 2 | 0 | 0 | 2 |
| Weightlifting | 9 | 1 | 0 | 10 |
| Wrestling | 14 | 0 | 0 | 14 |
| Wushu | 11 | 3 | 3 | 17 |
| Total | 175 | 92 | 45 | 312 |

== Badminton ==
=== Men ===
==== Team ====
| Quarterfinal | Semifinal | Final | |
| Opposition Score | Opposition Score | Opposition Score | Rank |
|---|---|---|---|
| Bye | | | 1st place, gold medalist(s) |

=== Women ===
==== Team ====
| Quarterfinal | Semifinal | Final | |
| Opposition Score | Opposition Score | Opposition Score | Rank |
|---|---|---|---|
| Bye | | | 1st place, gold medalist(s) |

== Taekwondo ==
=== Poomsae ===
| Athlete | Event | Points | Rank |
|---|---|---|---|
| Lalthlamuanpuia | MEN'S INDIVIDUAL POOMSAE (17-23) YEARS | 8.120 | 5 |
| Rahul Jain | MEN'S INDIVIDUAL POOMSAE (23-29) YEARS | 8.270 | 2nd place, silver medalist(s) |
| Gangphung | MEN'S INDIVIDUAL POOMSAE 29 YEARS ABOVE | 8.030 | 3rd place, bronze medalist(s) |
| Rupa Bayor | WOMEN'S INDIVIDUAL POOMSAE (17-23) YEARS | 8.130 | 2nd place, silver medalist(s) |
| Harsha Singha | WOMEN'S INDIVIDUAL POOMSAE (23-29) YEARS | 8.00 | 3rd place, bronze medalist(s) |
| Prajakta Ankoleka | WOMEN'S INDIVIDUAL POOMSAE 29 YEARS ABOVE | 7.640 | 2nd place, silver medalist(s) |
| Shilpa Thapa and Kunnal Kumar | PAIR POOMSAE (17-23) YEARS | 8.210 | 2nd place, silver medalist(s) |
| Gaurav Singh and Harsha Singha | PAIR POOMSAE (23-29) YEARS | 8.310 | 1st place, gold medalist(s) |
| Atul Pangotra and Prajakta Ankolekar | PAIR POOMSAE 29 YEARS ABOVE | 7.730 | 5 |
| Lalthlamunapuia Lalfakzuala Daniel Lahumthanga | MEN'S TEAM POOMSAE (17-23) YEARS | NA | 1st place, gold medalist(s) |
| Ranjit Kumar Soyam Chiglemba Singh Laishram Dingku Singh | MEN'S TEAM POOMSAE 23 YEARS ABOVE | NA | 2nd place, silver medalist(s) |
| Mamata Kuamri Shah Shilpa Thapa Geeta Yadav | WOMEN'S TEAM POOMSAE (17-23) YEARS | NA | 2nd place, silver medalist(s) |

| Athlete | Event | Rank |
|---|---|---|
| Kanha Mainali | MEN'S 54 kg | 3rd place, bronze medalist(s) |
| Prithvi Raj Chouhan | MEN'S 68 kg | 3rd place, bronze medalist(s) |
| Radha Bhati | WOMEN'S 46 kg | 3rd place, bronze medalist(s) |
| Kashish Malik | WOMEN'S 57 kg | 1st place, gold medalist(s) |

== Triathlon ==
| Athlete | Event | Timing | Rank |
|---|---|---|---|
| Adarsha M .N. Sinimol | Men | 01:02:51 | 1st place, gold medalist(s) |
| Bishworjit Srikhom | Men | 01:02:59 | 2nd place, silver medalist(s) |
| Thoudam Sorojini Devi | Women | 01:14:00 | 2nd place, silver medalist(s) |
| Pragnya Mohan | Women | 01:14:57 | 3rd place, bronze medalist(s) |
| Pragnya Mohan M S Adarsh Sorojini Devi Thoudam Bishworjit Saikhom | Mixed Team | 01:35:20 | 1st place, gold medalist(s) |

== See also ==
- Doping at the South Asian Games
- India at the South Asian Games
