= Judo at the 2019 South Asian Games =

- Venue: Army Physical Fitness Centre, Lagankhel
- Dates: 8–10 December 2019

Judo is among the sports which is being contested at the 2019 South Asian Games. Judo is being hosted in the Army Physical Fitness Centre, Lagankhel between 8 and 10 December 2019.

== Medal table ==
* Host nation (Nepal)

Rank	Nation	Gold	Silver	Bronze	Total
1	India (IND)	10	4	1	15
2	Nepal (NEP)*	2	6	6	14
3	Pakistan (PAK)	2	3	4	9
4	Sri Lanka (SRI)	1	2	10	13
5	Bangladesh (BAN)	0	0	6	6
6	Bhutan (BHU)	0	0	3	3
Totals (6 entries)		15	15	30	60

== Medalists ==
=== Men ===
Event	Gold	Silver	Bronze
60 kg	Vijaya Yadav; India	Wickrama Premarathna; Sri Lanka	Ngawang Namgyel; Bhutan
60 kg	Vijaya Yadav; India	Wickrama Premarathna; Sri Lanka	Umesh Magar; Nepal
66 kg	Jasleen Singh Saini; India	Indra Shrestha; Nepal	Kinley Tshering; Bhutan
66 kg	Jasleen Singh Saini; India	Indra Shrestha; Nepal	Muhammad Hasnain; Pakistan
73 kg	Chamara Repiyallage; Sri Lanka	Dangol Sanjit; Nepal	Tandian Wangchuk; Bhutan
73 kg	Chamara Repiyallage; Sri Lanka	Dangol Sanjit; Nepal	Vishal Rahul; India
81 kg	Anmoldeep Ingh; India	Karamat Butt; Pakistan	Rajtha Nuwarapaksha Gedara; Sri Lanka
81 kg	Anmoldeep Ingh; India	Karamat Butt; Pakistan	Nur Alam; Bangladesh
90 kg	Parmod Kumar; India	Qaisar Khan; Pakistan	Singankutti Arachchilage; Sri Lanka
90 kg	Parmod Kumar; India	Qaisar Khan; Pakistan	Shree Ram Makaju; Nepal
100 kg	Shah Hussain Shah; Pakistan	Ajay; India	Ramesh Bahadur Chand; Nepal
100 kg	Shah Hussain Shah; Pakistan	Ajay; India	Abey Singhe; Sri Lanka
+100 kg	Hamid Ali; Pakistan	Surender; India	Rajan Joshi; Nepal
+100 kg	Hamid Ali; Pakistan	Surender; India	Mohammed Irfan Ousman; Sri Lanka

=== Women ===
Event	Gold	Silver	Bronze
48 kg	Shushila Likmabam; India	Chamila Marappulige; Sri Lanka	Humaira Ashiq; Pakistan
48 kg	Shushila Likmabam; India	Chamila Marappulige; Sri Lanka	Soniya Bhatta; Nepal
52 kg	Devika Khadka; Nepal	Gayatri Tokas; India	Tahamida Jerin; Bangladesh
52 kg	Devika Khadka; Nepal	Gayatri Tokas; India	Shalani Gedara; Sri Lanka
57 kg	Suchika Tariyal; India	Manita Pradhan; Nepal	Amina Toyoda; Pakistan
57 kg	Suchika Tariyal; India	Manita Pradhan; Nepal	Madushani Kalu Liyannage; Sri Lanka
63 kg	Laishram Nirupama Devi; India	Nirmala Gharti Magar; Nepal	Ukroi Marma; Bangladesh
63 kg	Laishram Nirupama Devi; India	Nirmala Gharti Magar; Nepal	Hafsa Yameena Rifaz; Sri Lanka
70 kg	Garima Chaudhary; India	Binita Magar; Nepal	Sripali Kumara Vidanalage; Sri Lanka
70 kg	Garima Chaudhary; India	Binita Magar; Nepal	Dousuising Chowdury Kanta; Bangladesh
78 kg	Punam Shrestha; Nepal	Navneet Kaur; India	Leteeshia Wibushana Gedara; Sri Lanka
78 kg	Punam Shrestha; Nepal	Navneet Kaur; India	Farina Khanom; Bangladesh
+78 kg	Tulika Maan; India	Aakriti Joshi; Nepal	Withana Liyana Arachchilage; Sri Lanka
+78 kg	Tulika Maan; India	Aakriti Joshi; Nepal	Beenish Khan; Pakistan

=== Mixed ===
Event	Gold	Silver	Bronze
Team	India	Pakistan	Nepal
Team	India	Pakistan	Bangladesh
