= Naveen John =

Indian cyclist

Personal information
- Born: 7 April 1986 (age 40) Salmiya, Kuwait
- Height: 1.68 m (5 ft 6 in)
- Weight: 69 kg (152 lb)

Cycling career
- Sport: Cycling
- Current team: Karnataka
- Discipline: Road
- Role: Rider

Amateur teams
- 2012–2014: Specialized KYNKYNY Cycling Team
- 2015: Kingsnorth International Wheelers
- 2017–2020: Asfra Racing Oudenaarde
- 2018–?: Ciclo Racing Team
- 2021: Karnataka
- 2022: Wattbombs Elite
- 2022: Asfra Racing Team
- 2023–: Karnataka

Professional team
- 2016: State of Matter MAAP Racing

Naveen John (born 7 April 1986 in Salmiya) is an Indian racing cyclist, who currently rides for Indian team Karnataka.

== Career ==
In 2014, John became India's national time trial champion, defeating Arvind Panwar by one second. The following year, he joined British team Kingsnorth International Wheelers.

In 2016, John joined Australian UCI Continental team State of Matter MAAP Racing, making him the first Indian to join an international professional cycling team. In February, John regained his title as time trial champion. Later that season, John, along with Arvind Panwar, became the first Indians to compete in the World Championships, when they both competed in the time trial. He finished in 55th position.

In 2017, John left the Australian team, joining the Belgian club Asfra Racing Oudenaarde. He defended his title as national time trial champion, and also won the road race championship.

In 2018, John returned to the Ciclo Racing Team, with whom he spent 3 seasons with from 2010 to 2012. In February, John competed in the Asian Road Championships, finishing 10th in the time trial, and 44th in the road race.

In April 2019, Naveen John took part in the Asian Road Cycling Championships. He was 36th in the Mass-start road race.

== Major results ==
2012
2nd Overall Tour of Nilgiris
4th Road race, National Road Championships
2013
4th Time trial, National Road Championships
2014
1st Time trial, National Road Championships
2016
1st Time trial, National Road Championships
2017
National Road Championships

1st Time trial
1st Road race

2nd Overall Tour of Nilgiris

1st Stages 4 & 5

2018
1st Overall Tour of Nilgiris

1st Stages 3 & 5

2nd Time trial, National Road Championships
10th Time trial, Asian Road Championships
2019
1st Time trial, South Asian Games
1st Time trial, National Road Championships
2021
1st Time trial, National Road Championships
2022
8th Time trial, Asian Road Championships
2023
1st Time trial, National Road Championships
2024
1st Time trial, National Road Championships
