= Sri Lanka at the 2019 South Asian Games =

- IOC code: SRI
- NOC: National Olympic Committee of Sri Lanka

in Kathmandu and Pokhara, Nepal 1–10 December
- Competitors: 564
- Medals: Gold 40 Silver 83 Bronze 128 Total 251

South Asian Games appearances (overview)
- 1984; 1985; 1987; 1989; 1991; 1993; 1995; 1999; 2004; 2006; 2010; 2016; 2019; 2025

Sri Lanka competed in the 2019 South Asian Games in Kathmandu and Pokhara, Nepal from 1 to 10 December 2019.

== Cricket ==
Sri Lanka sent under-23 teams to participate in both the men's and women's events by sending U23 teams.

=== Men ===
The following cricketers were selected in the team:

1. Charith Asalanka (captain)
2. Kamindu Mendis (vice captain)
3. Pathum Nissanka
4. Hasitha Boyagoda
5. Vishwa Chathuranga
6. Ashen Bandara
7. Shammu Ashan
8. Nishan Madushka
9. Jehan Daniel
10. Asitha Fernando
11. Kalana Perera
12. Duvindu Tillekaratne
13. Sachindu Colombage
14. Kanishka Anjula

=== Women ===
The following cricketers were selected in the team:

1. Harshitha Madavi (captain)
2. Kavisha Dilhari
3. Sathya Sandeepani
4. Umesha Thimashini
5. Tharika Sewwandi
6. Lihini Apsara
7. Jimanjali Wijenayake
8. Sachini Nisansala
9. Nilakshana Sandamini
10. Shayani Oshadi
11. Malsha Ranatunga
12. Tharuka Shehani
13. Shikari Nuwantha
14. Sachini de Silva
15. Janadi Anali (TBR)

== Medal summary ==
Sri Lanka won 40 gold medals and a total of 251 medals.

=== Medal table ===
Sport	Gold	Silver	Bronze	Total
Athletics	15	12	8	35
Swimming	7	11	18	36
Taekwondo	4	7	16	27
Wrestling	2	10	2	14
Weightlifting	2	8	1	11
Wushu	2	5	6	13
Beach volleyball	2	2	0	4
Golf	2	0	2	4
Badminton	1	5	3	9
Judo	1	2	10	13
Boxing	1	2	8	11
Triathlon	1	0	3	4
Karate	0	4	15	19
Archery	0	4	4	8
Shooting	0	2	5	7
Cycling	0	2	4	6
Basketball	0	2	1	3
Cricket	0	2	0	2
Table tennis	0	1	6	7
Tennis	0	1	2	3
Kabaddi	0	1	1	2
Fencing	0	0	8	8
Squash	0	0	2	2
Volleyball	0	0	2	2
Handball	0	0	1	1
Football	0	0	0	0
Kho-Kho	0	0	0	0
Totals (27 entries)	40	83	128	251

== See also ==
Doping at the 2019 South Asian Games
