= Taekwondo at the 2019 South Asian Games =

- Venue: International Sports Complex, Satdobato
- Dates: 2–5 December 2019
- Nations: 7

Taekwondo is among the sports which is being contested at the 2019 South Asian Games. Taekwondo is being hosted in the International Sports Complex, Satdobato between December 2 and 5, 2019.

== Medal table ==
* Host nation (Nepal)

| Rank | Nation | Gold | Silver | Bronze | Total |
|---|---|---|---|---|---|
| 1 | Nepal (NEP)* | 12 | 6 | 11 | 29 |
| 2 | India (IND) | 9 | 10 | 7 | 26 |
| 3 | Sri Lanka (SRI) | 4 | 7 | 16 | 27 |
| 4 | Pakistan (PAK) | 3 | 6 | 8 | 17 |
| 5 | Bangladesh (BAN) | 1 | 0 | 10 | 11 |
| 6 | Bhutan (BHU) | 0 | 0 | 4 | 4 |
| Totals (6 entries) | | 29 | 29 | 56 | 114 |

=== Medalists ===
==== Kyorugi ====
| Event | Gold | Silver | Bronze |
|---|---|---|---|
| Men's 54 kg | Shah Zaib; Pakistan | Renhana Bandara; Sri Lanka | Manoj Malla; Nepal |
| Men's 54 kg | Shah Zaib; Pakistan | Renhana Bandara; Sri Lanka | Kanha Mainali; India |
| Men's 58 kg | Haroon Khan; Pakistan | Niraj Choudhary; India | Gobinda Bdr Ale; Nepal |
| Men's 58 kg | Haroon Khan; Pakistan | Niraj Choudhary; India | Not awarded |
| Men's 63 kg | Chalinda Sampath; Sri Lanka | Saurav Sharma; India | Gyanndra Hamal; Nepal |
| Men's 63 kg | Chalinda Sampath; Sri Lanka | Saurav Sharma; India | Mehmood Khan; Pakistan |
| Men's 68 kg | Bir Bahadur Mahara; Nepal | Muhammad Faheem; Pakistan | Tharanga Lakmal; Sri Lanka |
| Men's 68 kg | Bir Bahadur Mahara; Nepal | Muhammad Faheem; Pakistan | Prithvi Chauhan; India |
| Men's 74 kg | Jarnel Singh; India | Jabran Khan; Pakistan | Nischal Shrestha; Nepal |
| Men's 74 kg | Jarnel Singh; India | Jabran Khan; Pakistan | Darshana Kumara; Sri Lanka |
| Men's 80 kg | Rab Nawaz; Pakistan | Kiran Bdr Ale; Nepal | Lakshya; India |
| Men's 80 kg | Rab Nawaz; Pakistan | Kiran Bdr Ale; Nepal | Suranga Dihan; Sri Lanka |
| Men's 87 kg | Bhupen Shrestha; Nepal | Akshay Hooda; India | Rashel Khan; Bangladesh |
| Men's 87 kg | Bhupen Shrestha; Nepal | Akshay Hooda; India | Charma Tharindu; Sri Lanka |
| Men's +87 kg | Shaksham Karki; Nepal | Waqar Ali; Pakistan | Bless Balapatiyage; Sri Lanka |
| Men's +87 kg | Shaksham Karki; Nepal | Waqar Ali; Pakistan | Chaitanya Vijaya; India |
| Women's 46 kg | Kajal Shrestha; Nepal | Sidra Batool; Pakistan | Radha Bhati; India |
| Women's 46 kg | Kajal Shrestha; Nepal | Sidra Batool; Pakistan | Ishara Samarakoon; Sri Lanka |
| Women's 49 kg | Purva Dixit; India | Irangani Pushpa; Sri Lanka | Yunisha Rai; Nepal |
| Women's 49 kg | Purva Dixit; India | Irangani Pushpa; Sri Lanka | Ayesha Noor; Pakistan |
| Women's 53 kg | Latika Bhandari; India | Aneila Afsar; Pakistan | Ashmita Bhandari; Nepal |
| Women's 53 kg | Latika Bhandari; India | Aneila Afsar; Pakistan | Dasuana Nimesha; Sri Lanka |
| Women's 57 kg | Kashish Malik; India | Nima Gurung; Nepal | Tshering Yangchen; Bhutan |
| Women's 57 kg | Kashish Malik; India | Nima Gurung; Nepal | Naqsh Hamdani; Pakistan |
| Women's 62 kg | Sangita Bashyal; Nepal | Gaganjot Gill; India | Zoya Sabir; Pakistan |
| Women's 62 kg | Sangita Bashyal; Nepal | Gaganjot Gill; India | S. L. A. Maneesha; Sri Lanka |
| Women's 67 kg | Ruchika Bhave; India | Apsara Karki; Nepal | Sonam Yangtsho; Bhutan |
| Women's 67 kg | Ruchika Bhave; India | Apsara Karki; Nepal | Most Salma; Bangladesh |
| Women's 73 kg | Margerette Maria; India | Manita Shahi; Nepal | Sachitha Pramodini; Sri Lanka |
| Women's 73 kg | Margerette Maria; India | Manita Shahi; Nepal | Tandin Bidha; Bhutan |
| Women's +73 kg | Rodali Baruwa; India | Nisha Rawal; Nepal | Nuwanthi Lakmalai; Sri Lanka |
| Women's +73 kg | Rodali Baruwa; India | Nisha Rawal; Nepal | Not awarded |

==== Poomsae ====
| Event | Gold | Silver | Bronze |
|---|---|---|---|
| Men's individual (Ages 17–23) | Ranuka Prabath; Sri Lanka | Krishna Tamang; Nepal | Kamrul Islam; Bangladesh |
| Men's individual (Ages 17–23) | Ranuka Prabath; Sri Lanka | Krishna Tamang; Nepal | Ngawang Yonten; Bhutan |
| Men's individual (Ages 23–29) | Kamal Shrestha; Nepal | Rahul Jain; India | Nishshaka Jayasinghe; Sri Lanka |
| Men's individual (Ages 23–29) | Kamal Shrestha; Nepal | Rahul Jain; India | Mehadi Hassan; Bangladesh |
| Men's individual (Age 29+) | Dipu Chakma; Bangladesh | Lakshman Ilandarige; Sri Lanka | Rejin Rimal; Nepal |
| Men's individual (Age 29+) | Dipu Chakma; Bangladesh | Lakshman Ilandarige; Sri Lanka | Gangphung; India |
| Women's individual (Ages 17–23) | Sina Limbu Maden; Nepal | Rupa Bayor; India | Isuri Suhara; Sri Lanka |
| Women's individual (Ages 17–23) | Sina Limbu Maden; Nepal | Rupa Bayor; India | Anika Akter; Bangladesh |
| Women's individual (Ages 23–29) | Parbati Gurung; Nepal | Madhavee Jayaweera; Sri Lanka | Nurnahar Akter; Bangladesh |
| Women's individual (Ages 23–29) | Parbati Gurung; Nepal | Madhavee Jayaweera; Sri Lanka | Harsha Singha; India |
| Women's individual (Age 29+) | Ayasha Shakya; Nepal | Prajakta Ankolekar; India | Gayathri Sandamali; Sri Lanka |
| Women's individual (Age 29+) | Ayasha Shakya; Nepal | Prajakta Ankolekar; India | Mehrun Nisa; Pakistan |
| Mixed pairs (Ages 17–23) | Sri Lanka (SRI); Isuri Suhara; Ranuka Prabhath | India (IND); Shilpa Thapa; Kunnal Kumar | Nepal (NEP); Ashmin Raut; Sina Limbu Maden |
| Mixed pairs (Ages 17–23) | Sri Lanka (SRI); Isuri Suhara; Ranuka Prabhath | India (IND); Shilpa Thapa; Kunnal Kumar | Bangladesh (BAN); Nooruddin Hussain; Ruma Khatun |
| Mixed pairs (Ages 23–29) | India (IND); Gaurav Singh; Harsha Singha | Sri Lanka (SRI); Madhavee Jayaweera; Nishshaka Jayasinghe | Nepal (NEP); Jit Bahadur Bot; Parbati Gurung |
| Mixed pairs (Ages 23–29) | India (IND); Gaurav Singh; Harsha Singha | Sri Lanka (SRI); Madhavee Jayaweera; Nishshaka Jayasinghe | Pakistan (PAK); Muhammad Mumtaz; Asifa Ali |
| Mixed pairs (Age 29+) | Nepal (NEP); Sanjib Kumar Ojha; Ayasha Shakya | Pakistan (PAK); Mehrun Nisa; Shabaz Ahmed | Sri Lanka (SRI); Lakshman Ilandarige; Gayathri Sandamali |
| Mixed pairs (Age 29+) | Nepal (NEP); Sanjib Kumar Ojha; Ayasha Shakya | Pakistan (PAK); Mehrun Nisa; Shabaz Ahmed | Bangladesh (BAN); Dipu Chakma; Mousume |
| Men's team (Ages 17–23) | India (IND); Lalthlamunapuia; Daniel Lalfakzuala; Lalhumthanga | Sri Lanka (SRI); Ranuka Prabath; Amila Sahan; Nimesh Viranga | Nepal (NEP); Shishir Shrestha; Ashmin Raut; Dipendra Gurung |
| Men's team (Ages 17–23) | India (IND); Lalthlamunapuia; Daniel Lalfakzuala; Lalhumthanga | Sri Lanka (SRI); Ranuka Prabath; Amila Sahan; Nimesh Viranga | Bangladesh (BAN); Kamrul Islam; Nooruddin Hossain; Shishir Ahmed Joy |
| Men's team (Age 23+) | Sri Lanka (SRI); Nishshaka Jayasinghe; Lakshman Ilandarige; Krishantha Weerasinghe | India (IND); Ranjit Kumar; Soyam Chinglemba Singh; Laishram Dingku Singh | Nepal (NEP); Kamal Shrestha; Jit Bahadur Bot; Prem Bahadur Limbu |
| Men's team (Age 23+) | Sri Lanka (SRI); Nishshaka Jayasinghe; Lakshman Ilandarige; Krishantha Weerasinghe | India (IND); Ranjit Kumar; Soyam Chinglemba Singh; Laishram Dingku Singh | Pakistan (PAK); Muhammad Mumtaz; Muhammad Anas; Ahmed Shahbaz |
| Women's team (Ages 17–23) | Nepal (NEP); Nisha Darnal; Swastika Tamang; Sanjila Timalsina | India (IND); Mamta Kumari Shah; Shilpa Thapa; Geeta Yadav | Sri Lanka (SRI); Isuri Suhara; Sanjaeevi Udyogya; Hashini Chapa |
| Women's team (Ages 17–23) | Nepal (NEP); Nisha Darnal; Swastika Tamang; Sanjila Timalsina | India (IND); Mamta Kumari Shah; Shilpa Thapa; Geeta Yadav | Bangladesh (BAN); Anika Akter; Rum Khatun; Sumiya Imrose |
| Women's team (Age 23+) | Nepal (NEP); Nita Gurung; Prashansa Chhetri; Shusila Rai | Sri Lanka (SRI); Madhavee Jayaweera; Shalini Upekha; Danusha Nayangani | Pakistan (PAK); Asifa Ali; Iqra Zaheer; Mehrun Nisa |
| Women's team (Age 23+) | Nepal (NEP); Nita Gurung; Prashansa Chhetri; Shusila Rai | Sri Lanka (SRI); Madhavee Jayaweera; Shalini Upekha; Danusha Nayangani | Not awarded |
