= Archery at the 2019 South Asian Games =

- Venue: Pokhara Stadium
- Dates: 5–9 December 2019
- Competitors: 60 from 5 nations

Archery is among the sports which is being contested at the 2019 South Asian Games. Archery is being hosted in the Pokhara Stadium between 5 and 9 December 2019.

== Medal table ==
* Host nation (Nepal)

Rank	Nation	Gold	Silver	Bronze	Total
1	Bangladesh (BAN)	10	0	1	11
2	Bhutan (BHU)	0	5	3	8
3	Sri Lanka (SRI)	0	4	4	8
4	Nepal (NEP)*	0	1	2	3
Totals (4 entries)		10	10	10	30

== Medalists ==
=== Recurve ===
Event	Gold	Silver	Bronze
Men's individual	Ruman Shana; Bangladesh	Kinley Tshering; Bhutan	Sajeev De Silva; Sri Lanka
Women's individual	Ety Khatun; Bangladesh	Sonam Dema; Bhutan	Karma; Bhutan
Men's team	Bangladesh (BAN); Mohammad Islam; Mohammad Rubel; Ruman Shana	Sri Lanka (SRI); Ravien Dalpatadu; Sajeev De Silva; Sandun Herath	Bhutan (BHU); Kinley Tshering; Nima Wangdi; Lam Dorji
Women's team	Bangladesh (BAN); Ety Khatun; Mahanaz Monera; Beauty Ray	Sri Lanka (SRI); Thisari Silva; Rehana Tayabally; Malsha Waduge	Bhutan (BHU); Sonam Deki; Sonam Dema; Karma
Mixed team	Bangladesh (BAN); Ety Khatun; Ruman Shana	Bhutan (BHU); Sonam Dema; Kinley Tshering	Sri Lanka (SRI); Rehana Tayabally; Sajeev De Silva

=== Compound ===
Event	Gold	Silver	Bronze
Men's individual	Sohel Rana; Bangladesh	Tandin Dorji; Bhutan	Ashim Kumar Das; Bangladesh
Women's individual	Suma Biswas; Bangladesh	Anuradha Karunarante; Sri Lanka	Damayanthi Thakshila; Sri Lanka
Men's team	Bangladesh (BAN); Mohammad Ashikuzzaman; Ashim Das; Sohel Rana	Bhutan (BHU); Phuntsho Wangdi; Tandin Dorji; Karma Sherab	Nepal (NEP); Min Prasad Gauchan; Sanatan Malla; Yogendra Sherchan
Women's team	Bangladesh (BAN); Susmita Banik; Suma Biswas; Shamoli Ray	Sri Lanka (SRI); Anuradha Karunarante; Harshani Shalika; Damayanthi Thakshila	Nepal (NEP); Manju Bajagain; Imayung Rai; Magar Rana
Mixed team	Bangladesh (BAN); Susmita Banik; Sohel Rana	Nepal (NEP); Imayung Rai; Sanatah Malla	Sri Lanka (SRI); Damayanthi Thakshila; Sanjeewa Athanpola

== Participating nations ==
A total of 60 archers from five nations contested the archery competitions. Maldives did not enter any archers, while India was barred from competing because the Archery Association of India was suspended by World Archery. The amount of archers each nation entered is listed in parentheses beside the country's name.

- Bangladesh (16)
- Bhutan (8)
- Nepal (16)
- Sri Lanka (16)
- Pakistan (4)
