= Badminton at the 2019 South Asian Games =

- Venue: Badminton Covered Hall, Pokhara
- Dates: 1–6 December
- Competitors: 94 from 7 nations

Badminton at the 2019 South Asian Games was held in Badminton Covered Hall in Pokhara, Nepal between 1 and 6 December 2019. The badminton programme in 2019 included men's and women's singles competitions; men's, women's and mixed doubles competitions along with men's and women's team events. A total of 94 players from seven countries competed in the competition for 7 gold, 7 silver, and 14 bronze medals.

== Medal summary ==
=== Medal table ===
* Host nation (Nepal)

Rank	Nation	Gold	Silver	Bronze	Total
1	India (IND)	6	2	2	10
2	Sri Lanka (SRI)	1	5	3	9
3	Nepal (NEP)*	0	0	5	5
4	Pakistan (PAK)	0	0	3	3
5	Bangladesh (BAN)	0	0	1	1
Totals (5 entries)		7	7	14	28

=== Medalists ===
Event	Gold	Silver	Bronze
Men's singles	Siril Verma; India	Aryamann Tandon; India	Dinuka Karunaratne; Sri Lanka
Men's singles	Siril Verma; India	Aryamann Tandon; India	Ratnajit Tamang; Nepal
Women's singles	Ashmita Chaliha; India	Gayatri Gopichand; India	Achini Ratnasiri; Sri Lanka
Women's singles	Ashmita Chaliha; India	Gayatri Gopichand; India	Dilmi Dias; Sri Lanka
Men's doubles	India (IND); Krishna Prasad Garaga; Dhruv Kapila	Sri Lanka (SRI); Sachin Dias; Buwaneka Goonethilleka	Nepal (NEP); Prince Dahal; Praful Maharjan
Men's doubles	India (IND); Krishna Prasad Garaga; Dhruv Kapila	Sri Lanka (SRI); Sachin Dias; Buwaneka Goonethilleka	Pakistan (PAK); Muhammad Atique; Raja Muhammad Hasnain
Women's doubles	Sri Lanka (SRI); Thilini Hendahewa; Kavidi Sirimannage	Sri Lanka (SRI); Achini Ratnasiri; Upuli Weerasinghe	India (IND); Meghana Jakkampudi; N. Sikki Reddy
Women's doubles	Sri Lanka (SRI); Thilini Hendahewa; Kavidi Sirimannage	Sri Lanka (SRI); Achini Ratnasiri; Upuli Weerasinghe	India (IND); Kuhoo Garg; Anoushka Parikh
Mixed doubles	India (IND); Dhruv Kapila; Meghana Jakkampudi	Sri Lanka (SRI); Sachin Dias; Thilini Hendahewa	Nepal (NEP); Bikash Shrestha; Anu Maya Rai
Mixed doubles	India (IND); Dhruv Kapila; Meghana Jakkampudi	Sri Lanka (SRI); Sachin Dias; Thilini Hendahewa	Bangladesh (BAN); Mohammad Salman Khan; Urmi Akter
Men's team	India (IND); Arun George; Dhruv Kapila; Srikanth Kidambi; Krishna Prasad Garaga; Sanyam Shukla; B. Sumeeth Reddy; Aryamann Tandon; Siril Verma	Sri Lanka (SRI); Chirshan Danushka; Lochana de Silva; Sachin Dias; Madhuka Dulanjana; Buwaneka Goonethilleka; Hasitha Chanaka; Dinuka Karunaratne; Ranthushka Sasindu	Pakistan (PAK); Murad Ali; Muhammad Atique; Raja Muhammad Hasnain; Muhammad Muqeet Tahir; Awais Zahid
Men's team	India (IND); Arun George; Dhruv Kapila; Srikanth Kidambi; Krishna Prasad Garaga; Sanyam Shukla; B. Sumeeth Reddy; Aryamann Tandon; Siril Verma	Sri Lanka (SRI); Chirshan Danushka; Lochana de Silva; Sachin Dias; Madhuka Dulanjana; Buwaneka Goonethilleka; Hasitha Chanaka; Dinuka Karunaratne; Ranthushka Sasindu	Nepal (NEP); Jivan Acharya; Prince Dahal; Dipesh Dhami; Sunil Joshi; Bishnu Katwal; Praful Maharjan; Bikash Shrestha; Nabin Shrestha; Ratnajit Tamang; Sajan Krishna Tamrakar
Women's team	India (IND); Ashmita Chaliha; Sai Uttejitha Rao Chukka; Kuhoo Garg; Gayatri Gopichand; Meghana Jakkampudi; Aakarshi Kashyap; N. Sikki Reddy; Anoushka Parikh	Sri Lanka (SRI); Hasini Ambalangodage; Kavindika de Silva; Dilmi Dias; Thilini Hendahewa; Achini Ratnasiri; Kavidi Sirimannage; Upuli Weerasinghe; Hasara Wijayarathne	Pakistan (PAK); Sehra Akram; Palwasha Bashir; Huma Javeed; Bushra Qayyum; Ghazala Saddique; Mahoor Shahzad
Women's team	India (IND); Ashmita Chaliha; Sai Uttejitha Rao Chukka; Kuhoo Garg; Gayatri Gopichand; Meghana Jakkampudi; Aakarshi Kashyap; N. Sikki Reddy; Anoushka Parikh	Sri Lanka (SRI); Hasini Ambalangodage; Kavindika de Silva; Dilmi Dias; Thilini Hendahewa; Achini Ratnasiri; Kavidi Sirimannage; Upuli Weerasinghe; Hasara Wijayarathne	Nepal (NEP); Sobha Gauchan; Amita Giri; Jessica Gurung; Nita Lamsal; Rasila Maharjan; Anu Maya Rai; Sita Rai; Sima Rajbanshi; Pooja Shrestha; Nangsal Tamang

== Results ==
=== Men's singles ===
Semifinal
(India) Siril Verma	21	21
(Sri Lanka) Dinuka Karunaratne	9	12
(India) Aryamann Tandon	21	14	21
(Nepal) Ratnajit Tamang	18	21	18

Final
(India) Siril Verma	17	23	21
(India) Aryamann Tandon	21	21	13

=== Women's singles ===
Semifinal
(India) Ashmita Chaliha	21	21
(Sri Lanka) Achini Ratnasiri	5	7
(Sri Lanka) Dilmi Dias	17	14
(India) Gayatri Gopichand	21	21

Final
(India) Ashmita Chaliha	21	25
(India) Gayatri Gopichand	18	23

=== Men's doubles ===
Semi-finals
(India) Krishna Prasad Garaga (India) Dhruv Kapila	21	21
(Pakistan) Muhammad Atique (Pakistan) Raja Muhammad Hasnain	15	7
(Nepal) Prince Dahal (Nepal) Praful Maharjan	11	19
(Sri Lanka) Sachin Dias (Sri Lanka) Buwaneka Goonethilleka	21	21

Final
(India) Krishna Prasad Garaga (India) Dhruv Kapila	21	19	21
(Sri Lanka) Sachin Dias (Sri Lanka) Buwaneka Goonethilleka	19	21	18

=== Women's doubles ===
Semi-finals
(Sri Lanka) Thilini Hendahewa (Sri Lanka) Kavidi Sirimannage	21	21
(India) Meghana Jakkampudi (India) N. Sikki Reddy	14	18
(India) Kuhoo Garg (India) Anoushka Parikh	10	18
(Sri Lanka) Achini Ratnasari (Sri Lanka) Upuli Weerasinghe	21	21

Final
(Sri Lanka) Thilini Hendahewa (Sri Lanka) Kavidi Sirimannage	21	21
(Sri Lanka) Achini Ratnasiri (Sri Lanka) Upuli Weerasinghe	10	7

=== Mixed doubles ===
Semi-finals
(India) Dhruv Kapila (India) Meghana Jakkampudi	21	21
(Nepal) Bikash Shrestha (Nepal) Anu Maya Rai	14	13
(Bangladesh) Mohammad Salman Khan (Bangladesh) Urmi Akter	8	9
(Sri Lanka) Sachin Dias (Sri Lanka) Thilini Hendahewa	21	21

Final
(India) Dhruv Kapila (India) Meghana Jakkampudi	21	21
(Sri Lanka) Sachin Dias (Sri Lanka) Thilini Hendahewa	16	14
