= Tennis at the 2019 South Asian Games =

- Venue: International Sports Complex, Satdobato
- Dates: 2–10 December 2019

Tennis at the 2019 South Asian Games was hosted at the International Sports Complex, Satdobato, in Lalitpur, Nepal from 2 to 10 December 2019.

== Medal table ==
* Host nation (Nepal)

Rank	Nation	Gold	Silver	Bronze	Total
1	India	7	5	0	12
2	Pakistan	0	1	7	8
3	Sri Lanka	0	1	1	2
4	Nepal*	0	0	5	5
5	Bhutan	0	0	1	1
Totals (5 entries)		7	7	14	28

== Medalists ==
Event	Gold	Silver	Bronze
Men's singles	Manish Sureshkumar; India	Saketh Myneni; India	Aqeel Khan; Pakistan
Men's singles	Manish Sureshkumar; India	Saketh Myneni; India	Muzammil Murtaza; Pakistan
Women's singles	Sathwika Sama; India	Sowjanya Bavisetti; India	Prerana Koirala; Nepal
Women's singles	Sathwika Sama; India	Sowjanya Bavisetti; India	Anika Seneviratne; Sri Lanka
Men's doubles	India; Vishnu Vardhan; Saketh Myneni	India; Sriram Balaji; Jeevan Nedunchezhiyan	Pakistan; Muhammad Abid; Muzammil Murtaza
Men's doubles	India; Vishnu Vardhan; Saketh Myneni	India; Sriram Balaji; Jeevan Nedunchezhiyan	Pakistan; Aqeel Khan; Aisam-ul-Haq Qureshi
Women's doubles	India; Prerna Bhambri; Prarthana Thombare	India; Sravya Shivani; Bhuvana Kalava	Nepal; Abhilasha Bista; Ira Mehernissa Rawat
Women's doubles	India; Prerna Bhambri; Prarthana Thombare	India; Sravya Shivani; Bhuvana Kalava	Nepal; Prerana Koirala; Saloni Tamang
Mixed doubles	India; Sriram Balaji; Sowjanya Bavisetti	India; Jeevan Nedunchezhiyan; Prarthana Thombare	Pakistan; Muhammad Abid; Sara Mansoor
Mixed doubles	India; Sriram Balaji; Sowjanya Bavisetti	India; Jeevan Nedunchezhiyan; Prarthana Thombare	Pakistan; Aisam-ul-Haq Qureshi; Ushna Suhail
Men's team	India; Saketh Myneni; Manish Sureshkumar; Sriram Balaji; Niki Kaliyanda Poonacha; Vishnu Vardhan	Pakistan; Aqeel Khan; Muzammil Murtaza; Muhammad Abid; Aisam-ul-Haq Qureshi	Nepal; Samrakshyak Bajracharya; Pranav Khanal; Pradeep Khadka; Santosh Khatri; Samyak Bhusan Bajracharya; Nabin Paija
Men's team	India; Saketh Myneni; Manish Sureshkumar; Sriram Balaji; Niki Kaliyanda Poonacha; Vishnu Vardhan	Pakistan; Aqeel Khan; Muzammil Murtaza; Muhammad Abid; Aisam-ul-Haq Qureshi	Bhutan; Tandin Wangchuk; Pema Norbu; Nidup Gyeltshen
Women's team	India; Sowjanya Bavisetti; Sathwika Sama; Bhuvana Kalava; Prerna Bhambri; Prarthana Thombare; Sravya Shivani	Sri Lanka; Anjalika Kurera; Anika Seneviratne; Rukshika Wijesooriya; Alana Seneviratne	Nepal; Prerana Koirala; Saloni Tamang; Abhilasha Bista; Ira Mehernissa Rawat
Women's team	India; Sowjanya Bavisetti; Sathwika Sama; Bhuvana Kalava; Prerna Bhambri; Prarthana Thombare; Sravya Shivani	Sri Lanka; Anjalika Kurera; Anika Seneviratne; Rukshika Wijesooriya; Alana Seneviratne	Pakistan; Ushna Suhail; Mahin Aftab Qureshi; Sarah Mahboob Khan; Sara Mansoor
