= Table tennis at the 2019 South Asian Games =

Table Tennis at the 2019 South Asian Games
- Venue: Table Tennis Hall
- Location: Lainchwor, Kathmandu
- Date: 2 to 6 December 2019

Table tennis was one of the sports contested at the 2019 South Asian Games. Table tennis events were held in Kathmandu, Nepal from 2 – 6 December 2019. There were seven categories of competition, including both individual and team events as well as categories for both men and women.

== Medal table ==
* Host nation (Nepal)

Rank	Nation	Gold	Silver	Bronze	Total
1	India (IND)	7	5	0	12
2	Sri Lanka (SRI)	0	1	6	7
3	Nepal (NEP)*	0	1	5	6
4	Bangladesh (BAN)	0	0	2	2
5	Maldives (MDV)	0	0	1	1
Totals (5 entries)		7	7	14	28

== Medalists ==
Event	Gold	Silver	Bronze
Men's singles	Anthony Amalraj; India	Harmeet Desai; India	Santoo Shrestha; Nepal
Men's singles	Anthony Amalraj; India	Harmeet Desai; India	Purshottam Bajracharya; Nepal
Women's singles	Sutirtha Mukherjee; India	Ayhika Mukherjee; India	Erandi Warusawithana; Sri Lanka
Women's singles	Sutirtha Mukherjee; India	Ayhika Mukherjee; India	Ishara Madurangi; Sri Lanka
Men's doubles	India; Harmeet Desai; Anthony Amalraj	India; Sanil Shetty; Sudhanshu Grover	Sri Lanka; Chameera Ginige; Rashmika Krishnanand
Men's doubles	India; Harmeet Desai; Anthony Amalraj	India; Sanil Shetty; Sudhanshu Grover	Nepal; Santoo Shrestha; Binesh Khaniya
Women's doubles	India; Madhurika Patkar; Sreeja Akula	India; Sutirtha Mukherjee; Ayhika Mukherjee	Sri Lanka; Ishara Madurangi; Hansani Piumila
Women's doubles	India; Madhurika Patkar; Sreeja Akula	India; Sutirtha Mukherjee; Ayhika Mukherjee	Bangladesh; Sonam Sultana; Sadia Rahman Mou
Mixed doubles	India; Sutirtha Mukherjee; Harmeet Desai	India; Ayhika Mukherjee; Anthony Amalraj	Sri Lanka; Ishara Madurangi; Udaya Ranasinghe
Mixed doubles	India; Sutirtha Mukherjee; Harmeet Desai	India; Ayhika Mukherjee; Anthony Amalraj	Nepal; Nabita Shrestha; Santoo Shrestha
Men's team	India; Anthony Amalraj; Soumyajit Ghosh; Harmeet Desai; Sanil Shetty; Sudhanshu Grover	Nepal; Santoo Shrestha; Shiva Sundar Gothe; Purshottam Bajracharya	Sri Lanka; Chameera Ginige; Rashmika Krishnanand; Udaya Ranasinghe; Krishan Wickramarathna
Men's team	India; Anthony Amalraj; Soumyajit Ghosh; Harmeet Desai; Sanil Shetty; Sudhanshu Grover	Nepal; Santoo Shrestha; Shiva Sundar Gothe; Purshottam Bajracharya	Bangladesh
Women's team	India; Madhurika Patkar; Sreeja Akula; Sutirtha Mukherjee; Ayhika Mukherjee	Sri Lanka; Ishara Madurangi; Hansani Piumila; Erandi Warusawithana; Krittwika Sinha Roy	Nepal; Nabita Shrestha; Sikka Suwal; Elina Maharjan
Women's team	India; Madhurika Patkar; Sreeja Akula; Sutirtha Mukherjee; Ayhika Mukherjee	Sri Lanka; Ishara Madurangi; Hansani Piumila; Erandi Warusawithana; Krittwika Sinha Roy	Maldives; Fathimath Dheema Ali; Aishath Rafa Nazim; Laisa Fathulla Ismail
