= Wushu at the 2019 South Asian Games =

- Venue: Army Physical Fitness Centre, Lagankhel
- Dates: 5–8 December 2019

Wushu at the 2019 South Asian Games was contested at the Army Physical Fitness Centre, Lagankhel, in Lalitpur, Nepal, from 5 to 8 December 2019.

== Medal table ==
* Host nation (Nepal)

Rank	Nation	Gold	Silver	Bronze	Total
1	India (IND)	11	3	3	17
2	Nepal (NEP)*	5	6	5	16
3	Pakistan (PAK)	3	4	3	10
4	Sri Lanka (SRI)	2	5	6	13
5	Bangladesh (BAN)	0	3	11	14
Totals (5 entries)		21	21	28	70

== Medalists ==
=== Men's taolu ===
Event	Gold	Silver	Bronze
Changquan	Bijay Sinjali; Nepal	Mohammad Omar; Bangladesh	Anjul; India
Gunshu	Suraj Singh; India	Bishow Budha Margar; Nepal	Md. Rasel Hossain; Bangladesh
Nanquan	Deepak Hamal; Nepal	Sajan Lama; India	Md. Amir Hossain; Bangladesh
Taijijian	Tharidu Namal Anuratha; Sri Lanka	Gyandash Singh; India	Hari Prasad Gole; Nepal

=== Women's taolu ===
Event	Gold	Silver	Bronze
Changquan	Sushmita Tamang; Nepal	PHG Wathsala; Sri Lanka	Nur Baher Begum; Bangladesh
Nandao	Nima Gharti Magar; Nepal	Morzina Akther; Bangladesh	Sanju Kumari; Sri Lanka
Taijijian	MLDTS Gunasekara; Sri Lanka	Mina Glan; Nepal	Dipti Das; Bangladesh

=== Men's sanda ===
Event	Gold	Silver	Bronze
52 kg	Sunil Singh; India	Farhan Ali; Pakistan	Ashok Khaling; Nepal
52 kg	Sunil Singh; India	Farhan Ali; Pakistan	A.G.M. Chandika; Sri Lanka
56 kg	Uchit Singh; India	Shojib Hossain; Bangladesh	Abdul Khaliq; Pakistan
56 kg	Uchit Singh; India	Shojib Hossain; Bangladesh	S.R. Kumara; Sri Lanka
60 kg	Vikranta Baliyan; India	Mangal Tharu; Nepal	P.N. Balwardana; Sri Lanka
60 kg	Vikranta Baliyan; India	Mangal Tharu; Nepal	Md. Milon Ali; Bangladesh
65 kg	Ravi Panchal; India	K.W.A. Nipun Shanika; Sri Lanka	Saddam Hussein; Pakistan
65 kg	Ravi Panchal; India	K.W.A. Nipun Shanika; Sri Lanka	Md. Rakib Hossain; Bangladesh
70 kg	Suraj Yadav; India	Shahzaib Khair; Pakistan	S.G.R. Rumesh; Sri Lanka
70 kg	Suraj Yadav; India	Shahzaib Khair; Pakistan	Chitra Singh Thakuri; Nepal
75 kg	Maaz Khan; Pakistan	Puspa Kumara; Sri Lanka	Salim Ahmed; Bangladesh
75 kg	Maaz Khan; Pakistan	Puspa Kumara; Sri Lanka	Prabhat Kumar Joginath; India
80 kg	Sajid Hussain; Pakistan	Navveen; India	Md. Robel Khan; Bangladesh
80 kg	Sajid Hussain; Pakistan	Navveen; India	Nikesh Shrestha; Nepal
85 kg	Mohammad Amjad Iqbal; Pakistan	W.R.M.T. Madusanka; Sri Lanka	Kiran Saud; Nepal

=== Women's sanda ===
Event	Gold	Silver	Bronze
52 kg	Y. Sanathoi Devi; India	Alina Chaudhary; Nepal	Ms. Fatima; Pakistan
52 kg	Y. Sanathoi Devi; India	Alina Chaudhary; Nepal	SVPR Dilhani; Sri Lanka
56 kg	Juni Rai; Nepal	WPMM Madumali; Sri Lanka	O. Bidyapati Chanu; India
56 kg	Juni Rai; Nepal	WPMM Madumali; Sri Lanka	Saki Akter; Bangladesh
60 kg	Roshibina Devi; India	Maira Karamat; Pakistan	Rita Biswas Puja; Bangladesh
65 kg	Sushila; India	Sundas; Pakistan	none awarded
70 kg	Deepika; India	Binda Pun; Nepal	none awarded
75 kg	Punam; India	Silu Dangol; Nepal	none awarded
