= Golf at the 2019 South Asian Games =

- Venue: Gokarna Forest Resort
- Dates: 3–6 December 2019

Golf was contested at the 2019 South Asian Games. The events were hosted at the Gokarna Forest Resort, in Kathmandu, Nepal from 3 to 6 December 2019.

== Medal summary ==
=== Medal table ===
* Host nation (Nepal)

Rank	Nation	Gold	Silver	Bronze	Total
1	Nepal (NEP)*	2	0	2	4
1	Sri Lanka (SRI)	2	0	2	4
3	Bangladesh (BAN)	0	4	0	4
Totals (3 entries)		4	4	4	12

=== Medalists ===
Event	Gold		Silver		Bronze	
Men's individual	Subash Tamang; Nepal	274	Md Fahrad; Bangladesh	282	Sukrah Bahadur Rai; Nepal	284
Men's team	Nepal; Sukrah Bahadur Rai; Tanka Bahadur Karki; Subash Tamang; Niraj Tamang	838	Bangladesh; Md Shomrat; Md Fahrad; Md Shahabuddin; Md Shafique	856	Sri Lanka; Sisira Kumara; Chanaka Perera; N. Ranga; B.A. Sanjeewa	878
Women's individual	Grace Yatawara; Sri Lanka	296	Jakia Sultana; Bangladesh	317	Thuhashini Selvaratnam; Sri Lanka	318
Women's team	Sri Lanka; Thuhashini Selvaratnam; Grace Yatawara; Taniya Balasuriyia	607	Bangladesh; Nasima Akther; Sonya Akther; Jakia Sultana	639	Nepal; Kashmira Shah; Rabina Shrestha; Ushma Koirala	681
