= Fencing at the 2019 South Asian Games =

- Dates: 6–19 December 2019
- Host: Nepal
- Host city: Kathmandu
- Nations participating: 7

Winners
- Men's epee: India
- Women's epee: India
- Men's foil: India
- Women's foil: India
- Men's sabre: India
- Women's sabre: Bangladesh

Fencing at the 2019 South Asian Games will be held in Kathmandu, Nepal from 6 to 9 December 2019. This is for the first time that fencing has been included in the South Asian Games.

== Medal table ==
* Host nation (Nepal)

| Rank | Nation | Gold | Silver | Bronze | Total |
|---|---|---|---|---|---|
| 1 | India (IND) | 11 | 5 | 1 | 17 |
| 2 | Bangladesh (BAN) | 1 | 3 | 7 | 11 |
| 3 | Nepal (NEP)* | 0 | 4 | 6 | 10 |
| 4 | Sri Lanka (SRI) | 0 | 0 | 8 | 8 |
| 5 | Pakistan (PAK) | 0 | 0 | 2 | 2 |
| Totals (5 entries) | | 12 | 12 | 24 | 48 |

== Medalists ==
=== Men ===
| Event | Gold | Silver | Bronze |
|---|---|---|---|
| Individual épée | Sunil Kumar; India | Guruprakash Coppara Jayaprakash; India | Md Imtiaj; Bangladesh |
| Individual épée | Sunil Kumar; India | Guruprakash Coppara Jayaprakash; India | Ali Saeeduddin; Pakistan |
| Team épée | India; Guruprakash Coppara Jayaprakash; Jetlee Singh Chingakham; Sunil Kumar; Singh | Bangladesh; Das; Md Imtiaj; Mondal; Md Abdur Rahim | Pakistan; Nazar Abbas; Kashif Ali; Zaheer Mushtaq; Ali Saeeduddin |
| Team épée | India; Guruprakash Coppara Jayaprakash; Jetlee Singh Chingakham; Sunil Kumar; Singh | Bangladesh; Das; Md Imtiaj; Mondal; Md Abdur Rahim | Sri Lanka; Jayasundara Dilantha; Palmada; Subasingha; Chamara Warnasuriya Mudiyanselage |
| Individual foil | Vinoth Kumar Velautham; India | Rajeshor Singh Thounaojam; India | Tharindu Madumal; Sri Lanka |
| Individual foil | Vinoth Kumar Velautham; India | Rajeshor Singh Thounaojam; India | Rubel Mia; Bangladesh |
| Team foil | India; Khan; Bicky Thokchom; Rajeshor Singh Thounaojam; Vinoth Kumar Velautham | Bangladesh; Saddam Hossain; Razaul Karim; Rakib Mia; Rubel Mia | Sri Lanka; Anura Bandara; Tharindu Madumal; Vishmitha Bandara; Suresh Walimuni Dewage |
| Team foil | India; Khan; Bicky Thokchom; Rajeshor Singh Thounaojam; Vinoth Kumar Velautham | Bangladesh; Saddam Hossain; Razaul Karim; Rakib Mia; Rubel Mia | Nepal; Rajan Raj Khadka; Rakesh Maharjan; Jalendra Bahadur Shahi; Gyanendra Timasina |
| Individual sabre | Karan Singh Gurjar; India | Gisho Nidhi Kumaresan Padma; India | Efta Khairul Alam Bipul; Bangladesh |
| Individual sabre | Karan Singh Gurjar; India | Gisho Nidhi Kumaresan Padma; India | Roshan Arachchige; Sri Lanka |
| Team sabre | India; Gisho Nidhi Kumaresan Padma; Shahi; Karan Singh Gurjar | Bangladesh; Efta Khairul Alam Bipul; Swapan Kumar Chakma; Rahaman; Md Khayruzzaman | Sri Lanka; Roshan Arachchige; Asan; Fernando; Jayasuriya Sasanka |
| Team sabre | India; Gisho Nidhi Kumaresan Padma; Shahi; Karan Singh Gurjar | Bangladesh; Efta Khairul Alam Bipul; Swapan Kumar Chakma; Rahaman; Md Khayruzzaman | Nepal; Amit Bhandari; Dinesh Pandey; Rajendra Gajurel; Payesh Yonjan |

=== Women ===
| Event | Gold | Silver | Bronze |
|---|---|---|---|
| Individual épée | Thoudam Kabita Devi; India | Sheetal Dalal; India | Januka Syangtan; Nepal |
| Individual épée | Thoudam Kabita Devi; India | Sheetal Dalal; India | Indira Paudel; Nepal |
| Team épée | India; Arrora; Dahiwal; Sheetal Dalal; Thoudam Kabita Devi | Nepal; Anita Karki; Sita Pathak; Indira Poudel; Januka Syangtan | Bangladesh; Asma Akter; Mosammat Munjila Akter; Kamrunnahar; Nazma Khatun |
| Team épée | India; Arrora; Dahiwal; Sheetal Dalal; Thoudam Kabita Devi | Nepal; Anita Karki; Sita Pathak; Indira Poudel; Januka Syangtan | Sri Lanka; Chathuni Bhagya; Piyumi Ralalage; Pushpa Kumari; Shiromani Chathurangi |
| Individual foil | Thoibi Devi Wangelbam; India | Radhika Prakash Awati; India | Mohima Akter Mou; Bangladesh |
| Individual foil | Thoibi Devi Wangelbam; India | Radhika Prakash Awati; India | Rama Singh; Nepal |
| Team foil | India; Devi; Radhika Prakash Awati; Rani Devi; Thoibi Devi Wangelbam | Nepal; Goma Acharya; Anita Adhikari; Rama Singh; Anju Tamang | Bangladesh; Khatun; Mohima Akter Mou; Sanjida; Shopna |
| Team foil | India; Devi; Radhika Prakash Awati; Rani Devi; Thoibi Devi Wangelbam | Nepal; Goma Acharya; Anita Adhikari; Rama Singh; Anju Tamang | Sri Lanka; Ashoka Abeynayaka; Hansani; Galange Roshika Wijewardhana; Sinna Karuppan Bawani Sri |
| Individual sabre | Fatema Mujib; Bangladesh | Rabina Thapa; Nepal | Diana Devi Thingujam; India |
| Individual sabre | Fatema Mujib; Bangladesh | Rabina Thapa; Nepal | Asmita Basnet; Nepal |
| Team sabre | India; Josna Christy Jose; Jagmeet Kaur; Komalpreet Shukla; Diana Devi Thingujam | Nepal; Asmita Basnet; Sikshya Napit; Kamala Shrestha; Rabina Thapa | Sri Lanka; Nishani Fernando; Nilanka Withanage; Prathiba Karunarathne; Rathnamali Abeysekara |
| Team sabre | India; Josna Christy Jose; Jagmeet Kaur; Komalpreet Shukla; Diana Devi Thingujam | Nepal; Asmita Basnet; Sikshya Napit; Kamala Shrestha; Rabina Thapa | Bangladesh; Chadni Akter; Nazia Khatun; Fatema Mujib; Nipa |
