= Football at the 2019 South Asian Games =

- Venues: Kathmandu
- Dates: 1–10 December
- Nations: 5 (from 1 confederation)

Medalists
Gold medal	Nepal (men); India (women)
Silver medal	Bhutan (men); Nepal (women)
Bronze medal	Bangladesh (men); Maldives (women)

Football at the 2019 South Asian Games is the 3rd edition to introduce Women's football to the games, alongside men's.

== Competition schedule ==
The men's tournament will be held from 1 December to 10 December 2019 while the women's tournament will be contested from 3 December to 10 December 2019.

== Venues ==
Football at the 2019 South Asian Games is scheduled to be held in two venues in Nepal; the Dasarath Rangasala Stadium in Kathmandu for the men's tournament and the Pokhara Rangasala in Pokhara for the women's tournament.

Kathmandu	Pokhara
Dasarath Rangasala Stadium	Pokhara Rangasala
27°41′42″N 85°18′53″E	28°12′15.8″N 83°59′30″E
Capacity: 20,000	Capacity: 5,000
Football at the 2019 South Asian Games (Nepal)

== Participating nations ==
=== Men's tournament ===
- Bangladesh
- Bhutan
- India^{‡}
- Maldives
- Nepal
- Sri Lanka

^{‡} India decided not to participate in the men's event but was included in the men's event draw.

=== Women's tournament ===
- India
- Maldives
- Nepal
- Sri Lanka

== Medal summary ==
=== Medal table ===
Rank	Nation	Gold	Silver	Bronze	Total
1	Nepal	1	1	0	2
2	India	1	0	0	1
3	Bhutan	0	1	0	1
4	Bangladesh	0	0	1	1
4	Maldives	0	0	1	1
Totals (5 entries)		2	2	2	6

=== Medalists ===
Event	Gold	Silver	Bronze
Men	Nepal	Bhutan	Bangladesh
Women	India	Nepal	Maldives
