= Cycling at the 2019 South Asian Games =

- Venue: Sahid Park, Gokarna (mountain biking); Ring Road (road cycling)
- Dates: 4–7 December 2019

Cycling is among the sports contested at the 2019 South Asian Games. Cycling was hosted at the Sahid Park, Gokarna (mountain biking) and Ring Road (road cycling) between 4 and 7 December 2019.

== Medal table ==
The host country is highlighted in lavender

* Host nation (Nepal)

Rank	Nation	Gold	Silver	Bronze	Total
1	Nepal (NEP)*	4	4	2	10
2	India (IND)	4	2	2	8
3	Sri Lanka (SRI)	0	2	4	6
Totals (3 entries)		8	8	8	24

== Medalists ==
=== Mountain biking ===
Event	Gold	Silver	Bronze
Men's cross-country	Buddhi Tamang; Nepal	Rajeev Rai; Nepal	Okesh Bajracharya; Nepal
Men's downhill	Rajesh Magar; Nepal	Nirav Shrestha; Nepal	Prachit Magar; Nepal
Women's cross-country	Laxmi Magar; Nepal	Usha Khanal; Nepal	Pranita Soman; India
Women's downhill	Nishma Shrestha; Nepal	Jamuna Thapa; Nepal	Yashodhara Sherkar; India

=== Road cycling ===
Event	Gold	Silver	Bronze
Men's road race	Satbir Singh; India	Madushanka Silva; Sri Lanka	Silva Chamodde; Sri Lanka
Men's time trial	Naveen John; India	Arvind Panwar; India	Mawatha Avisha; Sri Lanka
Women's road race	Sonali Chanu; India	Swasti Singh; India	Solochana Nawanage; Sri Lanka
Women's time trial	Elangbam Devi; India	Dinesha Mudiyanselage; Sri Lanka	Udeshani Kumarasinghe; Sri Lanka
