= Squash at the 2019 South Asian Games =

Squash at the 2019
- Venue: International Sports Complex, Satdobato
- Dates: 6–10 December 2019

Squash was contested at the 2019 South Asian Games. Squash competitions were held at the International Sports Complex, Satdobato, in Lalitpur, Nepal from 6 to 10 December 2019.

== Medal table ==
Host country

Rank	Nation	Gold	Silver	Bronze	Total
1	India (IND)	2	3	1	6
2	Pakistan (PAK)	2	1	3	6
3	Nepal (NEP)*	0	0	2	2
3	Sri Lanka (SRI)	0	0	2	2
5	Bangladesh (BAN)	0	0	0	0
Totals (5 entries)		4	4	8	16

== Medalists ==
Event	Gold	Silver	Bronze
Men's singles	Tayyab Aslam; Pakistan	Harinder Pal Sandhu; India	Abhay Singh; India
Men's singles	Tayyab Aslam; Pakistan	Harinder Pal Sandhu; India	Farhan Mehboob; Pakistan
Women's singles	Tanvi Khanna; India	Sunayna Kuruvilla; India	Faiza Zafar; Pakistan
Women's singles	Tanvi Khanna; India	Sunayna Kuruvilla; India	Madina Zafar; Pakistan
Men's team	Pakistan (PAK); Tayyab Aslam; Farhan Mehboob; Muhammad Asim Khan; Amaad Fareed	India (IND); Harinder Pal Sandhu; Abhay Singh; Abhishek Dhruva Pradhan; Abhishek Agarwal	Sri Lanka (SRI); Ravindu Laksiri; Shamil Wakeel; Drunvinka Manura Perara; Nogoor Shaziff Mohammedu Hakeem
Men's team	Pakistan (PAK); Tayyab Aslam; Farhan Mehboob; Muhammad Asim Khan; Amaad Fareed	India (IND); Harinder Pal Sandhu; Abhay Singh; Abhishek Dhruva Pradhan; Abhishek Agarwal	Nepal (NEP); Arhanta Keshar Simha; Amrit Thapa Magar; Amir Bhlon; Dipak Thapa
Women's team	India (IND); Tanvi Khanna; Sunayna Kuruvilla; Sanya Vats; Urwashi Joshi	Pakistan (PAK); Madina Zafar; Faiza Zafar; Amna Fayyaz; Moqaddas Ashraf	Sri Lanka (SRI); Mihiliya Methsarani; Fathoum Issadeen; Yeheni Vonara Karuppu; Sameera Rukshana Deen
Women's team	India (IND); Tanvi Khanna; Sunayna Kuruvilla; Sanya Vats; Urwashi Joshi	Pakistan (PAK); Madina Zafar; Faiza Zafar; Amna Fayyaz; Moqaddas Ashraf	Nepal (NEP); Krishna Thapa; Bipana Bhlon; Bhavana Sunuwar; Swasthani Shrestha
