= Triathlon at the 2019 South Asian Games =

- Venue: Pokhara
- Dates: 2–4 December 2019

Triathlon is among the sports which is being contested at the 2019 South Asian Games. Triathlon is being hosted in the city of Pokhara between December 2 and 4, 2019. The discipline of duathlon was added to the sports program for this edition of the games.

== Medal table ==
* Host nation (Nepal)

Rank	Nation	Gold	Silver	Bronze	Total
1	Nepal (NEP)*	2	3	1	6
2	India (IND)	2	2	1	5
3	Sri Lanka (SRI)	1	0	3	4
Totals (3 entries)		5	5	5	15

== Medalists ==
=== Triathlon ===
Event	Gold	Silver	Bronze
Men	Adarsha Sinimol; India	Bishworjit Srikhom; India	Basanta Tharu; Nepal
Women	Sony Gurung; Nepal	Thoudam Devi; India	Pragnya Mohan; India
Mixed relay	India (IND); Pragnya Mohan; Adarsha Sinimo; Thoudam Devi; Bishworjit Saikhom	Nepal (NEP); Sony Gurung; Dipesh Chaudary; Keshari Magar; Basanta Tharu	Sri Lanka (SRI); Puvini Kahandawala; Asanka Nilaweera; Gayani Dasanayake; Chalaka Wickramaarachchi

=== Duathlon ===
Event	Gold	Silver	Bronze
Men	Himal Tamata; Nepal	Lakshman Malla; Nepal	Jamuni Perera; Sri Lanka
Women	Eranga Dilrukshi; Sri Lanka	Humi Magar; Nepal	Udaya Kumari; Sri Lanka
