= Garima Chaudhary =

Indian judoka (born 1990)

Personal information
- Nationality: Indian
- Born: 2 April 1990 (age 36) Meerut, Uttar Pradesh, India
- Occupation: Judoka
- Weight: 62 kg (137 lb)

Sport
- Country: India
- Sport: Judo
- Coached by: JG Sharma, AC Saxena
Medal record
Representing India
South Asian Games
| Gold medal – first place | 2019 Kathmandu/Pokhara | 70 kg |

Profile at external databases
- IJF: 370
- JudoInside.com: 43383
- Updated on 10 August 2012

Garima Chaudhary (born 2 April 1990) is an Indian judoka. She was India's sole judoka at the 2012 London Olympics, competing in the Women's (63 kg) category.

== Childhood and early training ==
Born to parents hailing from a middle class family, Chaudhary was inclined to sports during her childhood. She was good at sports such as kabaddi, athletics and cricket. While the father of Chaudhary remained concerned about her education, her mother continued to encourage her interest in sports. She represented her native state of Uttar Pradesh initially. Due to lack of suitable support from the state's sports association, she began representing Haryana in national-level competitions.

Since 2004, Chaudhary has been training with Jiwan Sharma and Divya Sharma at Patiala-based National Institute of Sports. Due to lack of proper facilities, she had to practice with boys. Chaudhury found this to be a good way to train. Sharma says that attributes such as self-belief, hard work and a winning attitude are Chaudhary's strengths.

== 2012 Summer Olympics ==
She participated at the 2011 World Judo Championships held in Paris and at the World Cup as a part of her qualification for the 2012 Summer Olympics. At the 2012 Asian Judo Championships held in Tashkent, she finished seventh in the 63 kg category. As a result of her performances, she earned 34 points and the eligibility to represent India at the London Olympics.

In order to prepare for the Olympics, Chaudhary trained in Germany and France. She underwent a more competition-oriented training, studied her opponents, and focused on specific fitness aspects.

In the first elimination round of the Women's (63 kg) category at the 2012 London Olympics, Chaudhary was defeated by Yoshie Ueno by an Ippon in 81 seconds. Although this ended her challenge at the Olympics, India's sports administrators felt that she is a good medal prospect at the Glasgow Commonwealth Games and the Incheon Asian Games - both in 2014.

At the 2014 Commonwealth Games, Chaudhary reached the quarter finals.

In South Asian Games 2019. She won gold medal in Women's 70 kg weight class.

Chaudary competed in the 2023 Asian Games. She also competed in several other competitions in 2023 as well as the Tashkent Grand Slam in February 2024.
