= India national 3x3 team =

India national 3x3 team may refer to:

- India men's national 3x3 team
- India women's national 3x3 team
