= Ayhika Mukherjee =

Indian table tennis player

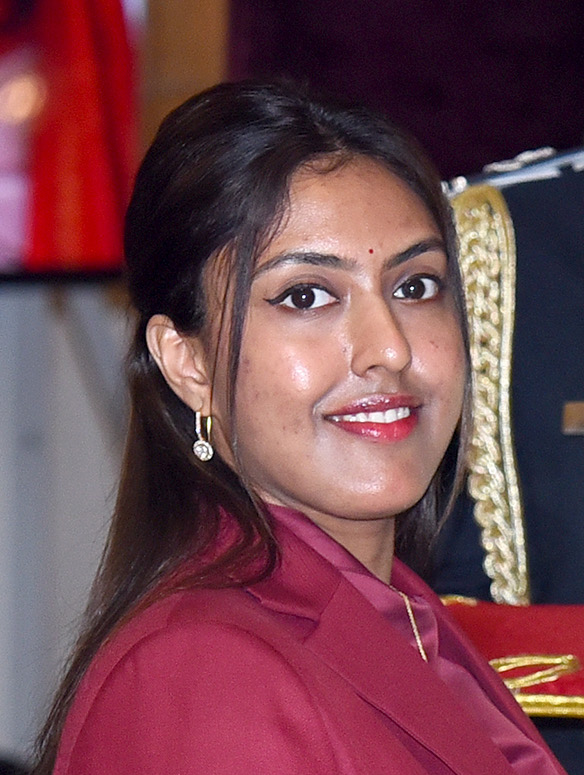

Personal information
- Born: 10 June 1997 (age 29) Naihati, West Bengal, India
- Height: 1.60 m (5 ft 3 in)

Sport
- Sport: Table tennis
- Club: Puneri Paltan (2019, 2024); Dabang Delhi (2023); RP-SG Mavericks (2018)
- Playing style: Right-handed shakehand
- Highest ranking: 84 (5 November 2024)
- Current ranking: 94 (15 July 2025)
Medal record
Women's table tennis
Representing India
Asian Games
Bronze medal – third place	2022 Hangzhou	Doubles
Asian Championships
Bronze medal – third place	2024 Astana	Team
Bronze medal – third place	2024 Astana	Doubles
South Asian Games
Gold medal – first place	2019 Kathmandu / Pokhara	Team
Silver medal – second place	2019 Kathmandu / Pokhara	Singles
Silver medal – second place	2019 Kathmandu / Pokhara	Doubles
Silver medal – second place	2019 Kathmandu / Pokhara	Mixed doubles

Ayhika Mukherjee (born 10 June 1997) is an Indian table tennis player from West Bengal. She was part of the Indian team for the 2018 Asian Games and 2022 Asian Games. She, along with Sutirtha Mukherjee, won the bronze medal for India in women's doubles table tennis in the Asian Games.

== Career ==
Sutirtha Mukherjee and Ayhika Mukherjee advanced to women's doubles final at the WTT Contender Muscat in 2022. The pair won their first WTT title at the WTT Contender Tunis 2023 by defeating South Korea's Shin Yu-bin and Jeon Ji-hee in the semifinal before a victory against Miyuu Kihara and Miwa Harimoto of Japan in the final. In the 2022 Asian Games, they defeated the Chinese Champions Chen Meng and Wang Yidi in the quarter finals, won a historical bronze medal for India before losing to North Korea's Cha Su-yong and Pak Su-gyong.

She also won against the World no. 1 from China, Sun Yingsha, in the World Table Tennis Team Championships 2024. At 2024 Asian Table Tennis Championships, Ayhika Mukherjee and Sutirtha Mukherjee won bronze medal by defeating South Korea's Lee Eun-hye and Kim Nayeong in the Quarterfinals. She was also a part of the women's team that clinched first ever bronze medal in the same tournament.

In the 2014 Slovak Junior Open, she won a gold medal in Singles and in team event.

== Awards ==
- She was conferred the Arjuna Award for 2023.
