= Tour of Nilgiris =

Bicycle tour in India

Race details
- Date: December
- Region: South India
- English name: Tour of Nilgiris
- Discipline: Road Bike, MTB, Hybrid
- Type: Eight Day Cyclosportive
- Organiser: Breakaway Sports
- Web site: tourofnilgiris.com

History
- First edition: 2008
- Editions: 15 (as of 2024)

The Tour of Nilgiris is a bicycle tour in India organised by Breakaway Sports.

The tour has been held every year since 2008. The aim of the tour is to promote cycling within the Nilgiris region passing through three Southern states of India Karnataka, Kerala and Tamil Nadu and to revive the cycle culture by popularising cycle as a mode of transport for the twin benefits of easing traffic congestion and being environmental friendly. The event caters for both Charity Riders, Recreational Riders and those looking to move into competitive professional cycling.

== The Kalhatty challenge ==
The hardest part of the tour is the famous and gruelling Kalhatty climb. 12 km of climbing gradients and 36 hairpin bends to gain an altitude of 1,230 m. The average elevation gain is around 10 per cent with a few stretches going up to 15 per cent gradient.

Kalhatti is considered a Hors catégorie climb, which in cycling terms means "something that is beyond categorisation". It is perhaps one of the toughest climbs possible in the sub continent.

Kalhatti route is inside a Reserve forest and this route is subjected to changes dependending on the various department permissions.

== Participation ==
Tour snapshot
Year	Dates	Distance	Participation
2011	Dec 9 - Dec 16	860 km	70 Cyclists from 3 countries. 3 women riders. Cyclists from India, Italy and US.
2012	Dec 16 - Dec 23	860 km	85 Cyclists. 8 women riders.
2015	Dec 16 - Dec 23	876 km	109 cyclists from 8 countries. India, China, Germany, Nepal, Netherlands, Singapore, UK, and the USA.
2017	Dec 10 - Dec 17	1000 km	128 Cyclists from 8 countries. 18 international riders and 8 women riders. Cyclists were from India(110), Australia, Denmark, Germany, The Netherlands, Sweden, Russia and the USA.
2018	Dec 9 - Dec 16	950 km	110 Cyclists from 13 countries. 29 international riders and 17 women riders. India (81), Denmark(7), USA(4), Australia(3), Germany(3), UK(3), Belgium(2), Canada(2), Austria(1), Greece(1), Malaysia(1), Philippines(1) and Poland(1).
2019	Dec 8 - Dec 15	850+ km	56 Cyclists including 6 Women Riders and 5 International Riders
2022	Dec 11 - Dec 18	850+ km	107 Cyclists including 14 Women Riders and 10 International Riders
2023	Dec 10 - Dec 17	850+ km	100 Cyclists including 16 Women Riders and 6 International Riders
2024	Dec 08 - Dec 15	800+ km	85 Cyclists including 18 Women Riders and 20 International Riders
