= Pragnya Mohan =

Indian triathlete

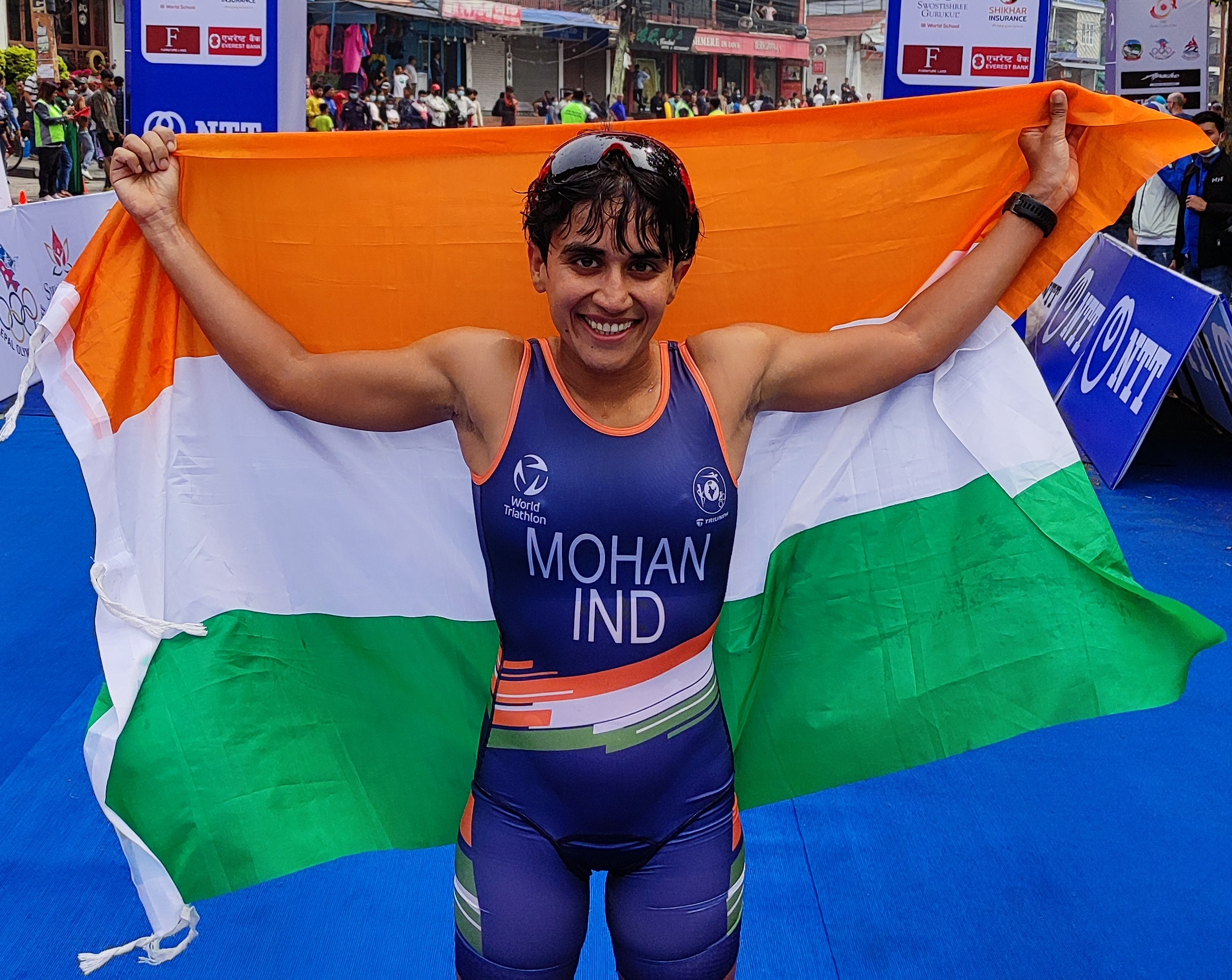
- Mohan at 2022 South Asian Triathlon Championship

Personal information
- National team: India
- Born: 19 October 1994 (age 31) Ankleshwar, Gujarat, India
- Home town: Ahmedabad, Gujarat
- Education: Institute of Chartered Accountants of India

Sport
- Country: India
- Sport: Triathlon
Medal record
Women's triathlon
Representing India
South Asian Games
| Gold medal – first place | 2019 Pokhara | Mixed Relay |
| Bronze medal – third place | 2019 Pokhara | Individual |
South Asian Championship
| Gold medal – first place | 2023 Pokhara | Individual |
| Gold medal – first place | 2022 Pokhara | Individual |
| Gold medal – first place | 2019 Pokhara | Individual |
| Silver medal – second place | 2018 Pokhara | Individual |
| Silver medal – second place | 2014 Pokhara | Individual |

Pragnya Mohan (born 19 October 1994) is an Indian triathlete from Ahmedabad, Gujarat. In Birmingham 2022, she led India's triathlon debut at the Commonwealth Games. She is India's highest ever ranked triathlete in the world. She is widely considered India's best bet for triathlon debut at the Olympic Games. In 2019, she became the first and only triathlete to represent India in the Triathlon World Cup. She is the current and multiple times South Asian and National Triathlon Champion and has won gold medals at the South Asian Games and the National Games.

In 2015, she was decorated with the Eklavya Award (Senior), the highest state sports award. She is also a Chartered Accountant from the Institute of Chartered Accountants of India.

She is also an International Olympic Committee (IOC) Young Leader and Oxford Climate Leader. She regularly speaks at the intersection of sports and sustainability, having delivered a keynote address at the 2024 United Nations Climate Change Conference (COP29) in Baku, Azerbaijan, at the Sports & Climate Action Panel.

== Early career ==
Mohan was born on 19 October 1994 in Ankleshwar, Gujarat. She started swimming at the age of two, learning it in the pool of Modiguard township. Seeing her potential, her parents sent her to a 45-day coaching camp in 2002. Once she mastered the finer aspects of swimming, even being a third grade student she went on to beat the high school students in the distance swimming event organized by her school. She started competitive swimming at the age of eight by participating in the CBSE west zone competition in Alwar. In 2003, after her family shifted to Atul, Gujarat, she was left without a coach and had to train on her own in the township of Atul Limited. Mohan steadily improved her performance in state meets going from bronze to gold. In 2006, she qualified for the swimming nationals for the first time.

In 2004, Mohan participated in her school's 5 kilometres (3.1 mi) mini marathon finishing second. Thereafter she started endurance running. In 2007 the family moved to Ahmedabad. Within seventy-five days of coming under the tutelage of Kamlesh Nanavati and training alongside national champions Vandita Dhariyal and Maana Patel, she finished first in the state championship. Combining the sports of swimming and running, she won the bronze medal in the sub-junior national aquathlon in 2008.

She started cycling in her high school years. In January, 2013, she won the inaugural 50 kilometres (31 mi) cycle race organized by Amdavad Municipal Corporation. She has won a total of 133 state championship medals in various disciplines. In December 2013, she won the gold medal in the women's category of 24th Gujarat State Aquathlon qualifying for the 2014 Senior National Triathlon Championship.

== Triathlon career ==
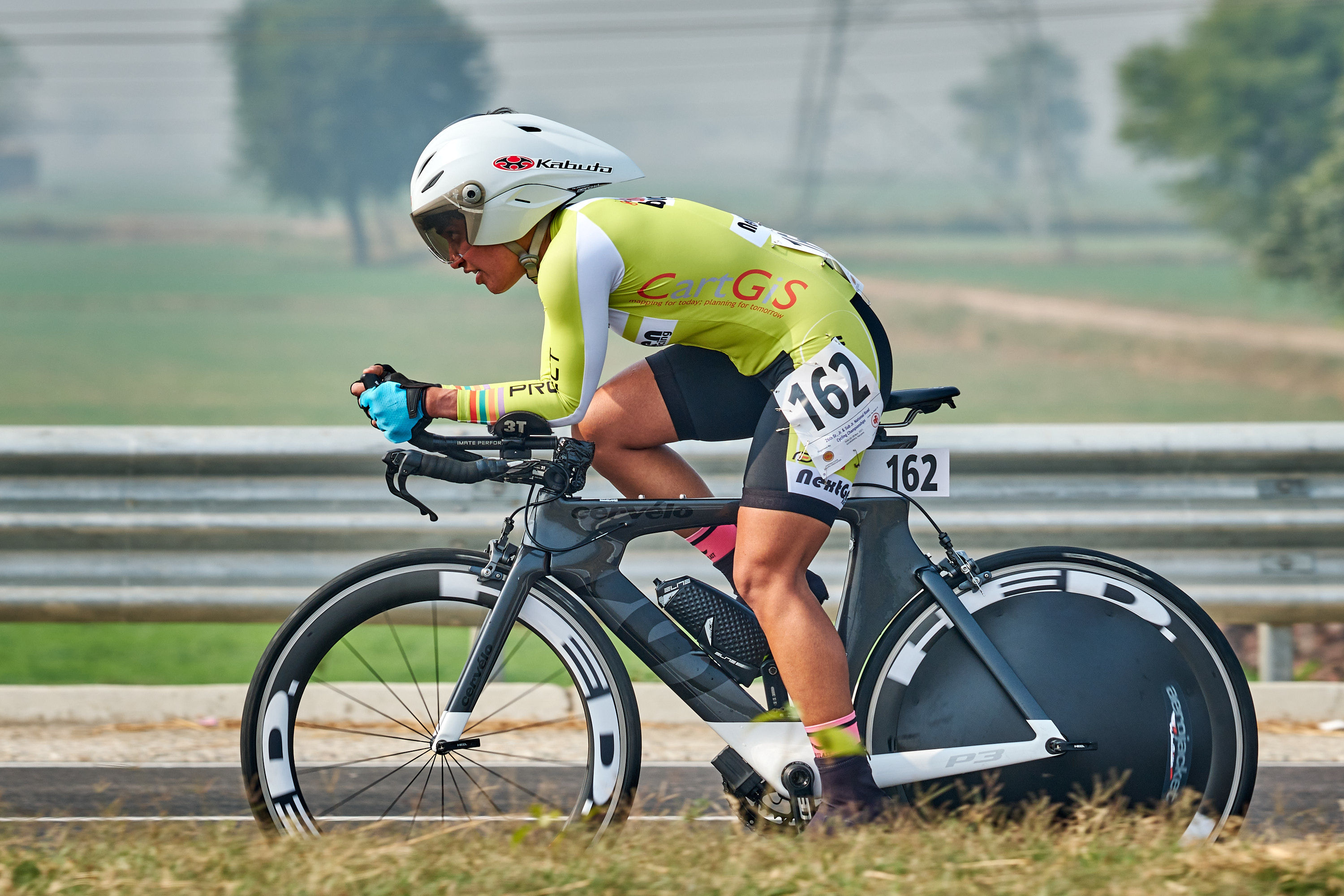
Mohan at 2021 National Road Cycling Championship

Mohan won the gold medal in the 2014 Senior National Triathlon Championship held at Nashik, Maharashtra. Subsequently, she clinched a silver medal at her maiden international meet - 2014 South Asian Triathlon Championship held at Pokhara, Nepal.

While representing her home state Gujarat, she won a gold medal in the 2015 National Games held at Thiruvananthapuram, Kerala from 31 January to 14 February 2015. In August 2015, the Government of Gujarat in light of Mohan's exceptional performance at national and international level, conferred her with its highest state sports award, the Eklavya Award (Senior).

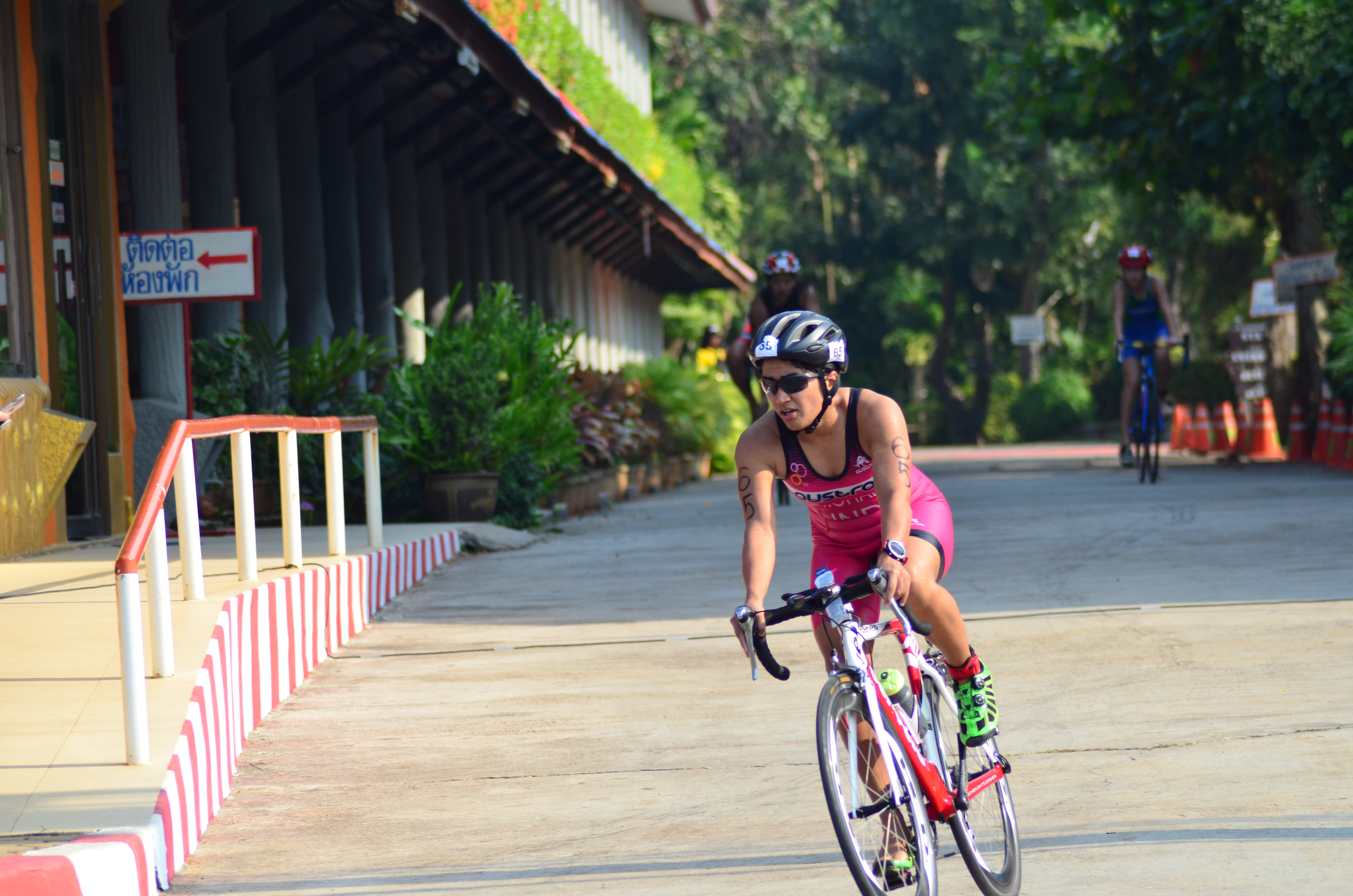
Mohan at the 2019 Rayong Asian Cup

She started the year 2018 by finishing second in the 2018 Senior National Triathlon Championship held at Visakhapatnam, Andhra Pradesh. Thereafter she won the silver medal in the 2018 South Asian Triathlon Championship held at Pokhara, Nepal.

Mohan began the year 2019 with winning the 2019 South Asian Triathlon Championship held at Pokhara, Nepal. This performance was her best performance at an international event. With this she qualified and participated in the 2019 Triathlon World Cup held at Madrid, Spain on 5 May 2019. She became the first triathlete to represent India at the World Cup. She went to win the 2019 Senior National Triathlon Championship held at Thiruvananthapuram, Kerala.

She participated in the 2019 South Asian Games held at Nepal from 1–10 December 2019. Battling stomach cramps, she won the bronze medal in women's triathlon individual category on 2 December 2019. Two days later, she led the opening leg of the Indian triathlon mixed relay team. Her strong performance of being the fastest amongst the female triathletes led the Indian team to a comfortable gold medal.

In January 2022, Mohan won the gold medal at the 2022 National Sea Swimming Competition in the 2,000 metres (1.2 mi) race held at Porbander, Gujarat. In March 2022, Mohan finished second in the selection trials for Indian cycling team held at Kurukshetra, riding the distance of 30 kilometres (19 mi) in 45:13.161 minutes for her individual time trial race. With this she qualified for the 2022 Asian Road Cycling Championships held at Dushanbe, Tajikistan.

In April 2022, Mohan defended her title of South Asian champion at the 2022 South Asian Triathlon Championship held at Pokhara, Nepal. This event saw the participation by the largest Indian contingent in an international race with 17 men and 12 women participating.

She competed at the 2022 Commonwealth Games where she came 26th in the women's event.

=== Accidents ===
Mohan has had five major accidents in her triathlon career, all while cycling on the road. In January 2014, while drafting behind her partner in Ahmedabad, she touched the front riders' rear wheel, fell and got dragged on the road. In March 2015, again in Ahmedabad she was hit by a SUV on the Sardar Patel Ring Road, due to which she got partial amnesia. In December 2017, while Mohan was at a high speed on a steep descent in Melbourne, she tried to dodge a pothole and lost control of the bike, fracturing her thumb. In June 2019, Mohan while cycling in Lleida, Spain lost control of her bike, fell and fractured her wrist bone. In both the latter cases, she underwent surgery. In November 2021, at the National Road Cycling Championship at Kurukshetra, Mohan was well positioned for a podium finish in the Women Elite's 80 kilometres (50 mi) Road Race. However a bunch of 14 riders including her fell just 500 metres before the finish line, causing her a serious ankle injury.

== Personal life ==
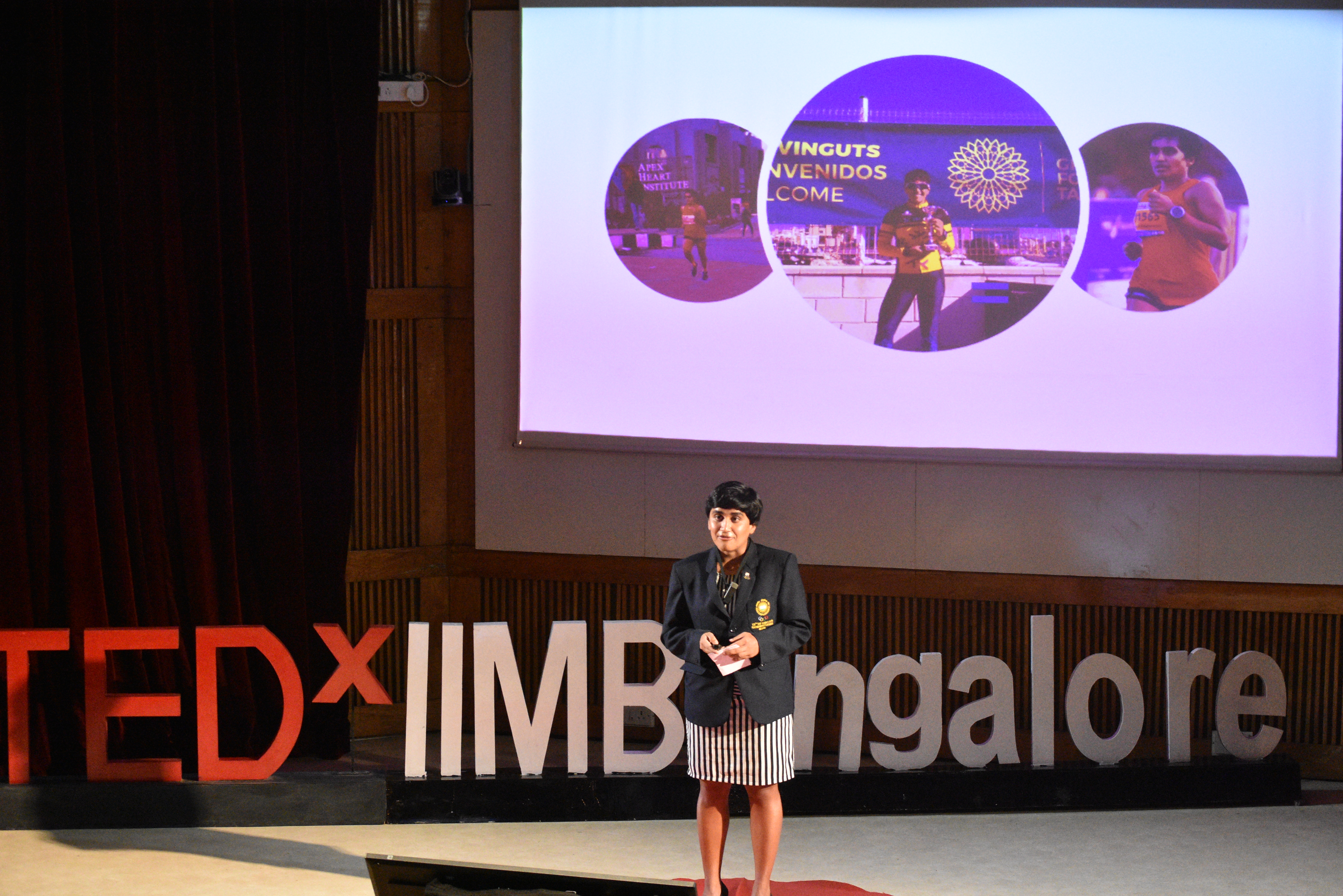
Pragnya Mohan speaking at the 2019 TEDx IIM Bangalore

Mohan, while a student of Eklavya School in Class XI choose the science stream. She was an above average science student and decided to pursue the Chartered accountancy course due to a good return for the time invested and option of self study meant more time for pursuing sports. After clearing her intermediate exam, she spent a year interning in Ernst & Young, a Big Four accounting firm. However, due to long hours of work and outstation audits, her sports suffered. In February 2015, she switched firms and in the summer of 2017, she cleared the final exams to qualify as a Chartered Accountant (CA) from the Institute of Chartered Accountants of India (ICAI). After which she plunged into training for triathlon full time. While in her hometown Ahmedabad she is coached by her father Pratap Mohan, she also travels to Australia and Spain to train under international coaches like Eva Ledesma.

Mohan is a public speaker having delivered TEDx talk at IIM Bangalore in 2019 alongside Kavita Krishnamurti, Tejasvi Surya and Komal Nahta and at IIM Ahmedabad in 2021 alongside Viral Acharya, Shivshankar Menon and Medha Patkar. She regularly speaks in ICAI national conferences about the lessons and importance of sports. She used to be a paper presenter at the CA Students National Conference and also bagged the best paper presenter award. She is also a qualified paragliding pilot having done her club pilot course from Kamshet.

She had travelled to Melbourne, Australia in March 2020 to train. She got stuck there due to the COVID-19 lockdowns. Later she decided to stay back as the situation in Melbourne improved and she had access to better training facilities. She returned in September 2021, spending 19 months away from her home in India.

In March 2022, the British High Commission, New Delhi had picked Mohan amongst top seven elite athletes of India alongside Neeraj Chopra, PV Sindhu and Pullela Gopichand as a role model sportsperson for the upcoming 2022 Commonwealth Games and posted a video on social media.

Mohan has been selected by the World Triathlon for their mentee program. As a part of it she is trying to popularize her sport in different parts of India particularly through talks at top educational institutes and the use of social media.

== Bibliography ==
- Sivakumar, R; Ram, V Pattabhi (February 2021). Nightingales - 2.0: How Eleven Women showed Grit, Guts and Gumption. D Rangaswamy Academy for Fiscal Research. ISBN 978-93-90740-08-6.
