= Suchika Tariyal =

Indian sportsperson (born 1990)

Personal information
- Born: 16 August 1990 (age 36) Budhana, Uttar Pradesh, India
Medal record
Representing India
Women's mixed martial arts
Asian Games
Bronze medal – third place	2026 Aichi–Nagoya	60 kg
Asian Championships
Bronze medal – third place	2026 Luzhou	60 kg
Bronze medal – third place	2026 Tashkent	60 kg
Women's jujutsu
World Championships
Gold medal – first place	2024 Heraklion	63 kg
Women's judo
South Asian Games
Gold medal – first place	2019 Kathmandu	57 kg
Commonwealth Championships
Gold medal – first place	2019 Walsall	57 kg
Silver medal – second place	2018 Jaipur	57 kg

Suchika Tariyal Hooda (born 16 August 1990) is an Indian sportsperson who has represented her country in international competitions in judo, kurash, jujutsu, and mixed martial arts.

== Early life ==
Suchika was born on 16 August 1990 in Budhana, Uttar Pradesh and raised in Rohtak, Haryana. Hailing from a conservative family, she initially faced opposition to pursue sports, particularly from her grandmother, who believed that girls should not be allowed to travel outside the home. At the age of 12, she experienced eve teasing, which led her to take up combat sports.

== Career ==
Suchika began her competitive career in judo, representing India at more than twenty international competitions and winning eight national titles. She won gold medals at the 2019 Commonwealth Championships and the 2019 South Asian Games, as well as a silver medal at the 2018 Commonwealth Championships in the women's 57 kg category. She also competed at several Asian Championships and placed fifth at the 2022 Commonwealth Games where she lost the bronze medal match.

She represented India in kurash at the 2022 Asian Games in Hangzhou. And later transitioned to jujutsu, winning the gold medal in the contact female 63 kg category at the 2024 Ju-Jitsu World Championships in Heraklion.

She also competed in mixed martial arts (MMA), making her professional debut in 2017. She took a seven-year break from MMA while competing in judo and jujutsu. In December 2024, she returned to professional MMA at BRAVE CF 92 in Bahrain after signing a multi-fight contract with BRAVE Combat Federation.

She won bronze medals in the women's 60 kg traditional MMA events at the 2026 AMMA Asian Championships in Luzhou and Tashkent. At the 2026 Asian Games in Nagoya, she won the bronze medal in the women's 60 kg category, becoming the first Indian athlete to win a MMA medal at the Asian Games. She lost the semifinal to Singapore's Hui Hoon Teo after the bout ended in a controversial draw upon referral, with Teo being awarded the tiebreaker for being 700 grams lighter at the weigh-in.

== Personal life ==
Suchika served as a Head constable in the Central Industrial Security Force and later joined the Government of Haryana's, Department of Sports, as a junior coach.

She was a contestant on the 18th season of MTV Roadies and was one of the warriors in India's Ultimate Warrior on Discovery+.
