= Nabin =

Nabin is a masculine name common in the Indian subcontinent.

Notable people with the name include:

- Nabin Chandra Bag, Indian politician
- Nabin Chandra Bardoloi (1875–1936), Indian writer and politician
- Nabin K Bhattarai (born 1974), Nepalese musician
- Nabin Nanda, Indian politician
- Nabin Rabha (born 1996), Indian professional footballer
- Nabin Subba (born 1967), Nepalese film director

== See also ==
- Nabin Jatra, a Bengali drama film
- Nitin Nabin, Indian politician
