= Sunayna Kuruvilla =

Indian professional squash player (born 1999)

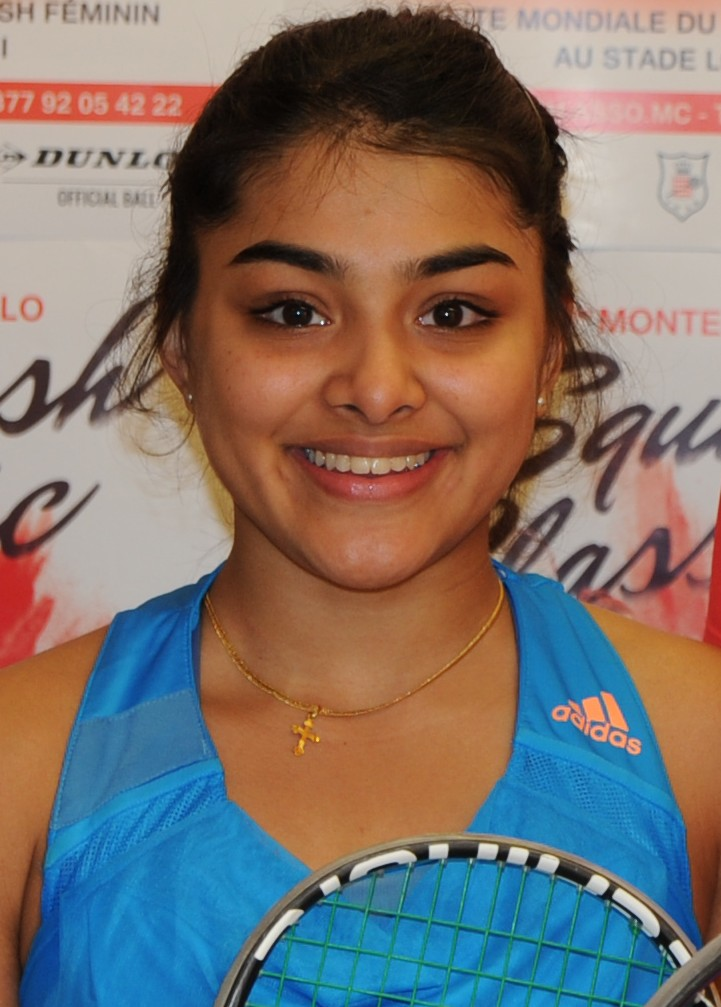
- Sunayna Kuruvilla, Monte Carlo Squash Classic 2018

Personal information
- Full name: Sunayna Sara Kuruvilla
- Born: May 22, 1999 (age 27) Kochi, India

Sport
- Country: India
- Retired: Active

Women's singles
- Highest ranking: No. 67 (February 2020)
- Current ranking: No. 67 (February 2020)
- PSA Profile
Medal record
Women's squash
Representing India
Asian Games
Silver medal – second place	2018 Jakarta	Team
South Asian Games
Gold medal – first place	2016 Guwahati	Team
Gold medal – first place	2019 Nepal	Team
Silver medal – second place	2019 Nepal	Singles
- Updated on February 2020

Sunayna Kuruvilla (born 22 May 1999) is an Indian professional squash player. As of February 2018, she was ranked number 89 in the world. She has played in the main draw of numerous professional tournaments. She won silver medal in women's team event at the 2018 Asian Games.
