= Anthony Amalraj =

Indian table tennis player (born 1986)

Amalraj Anthony Arputharaj
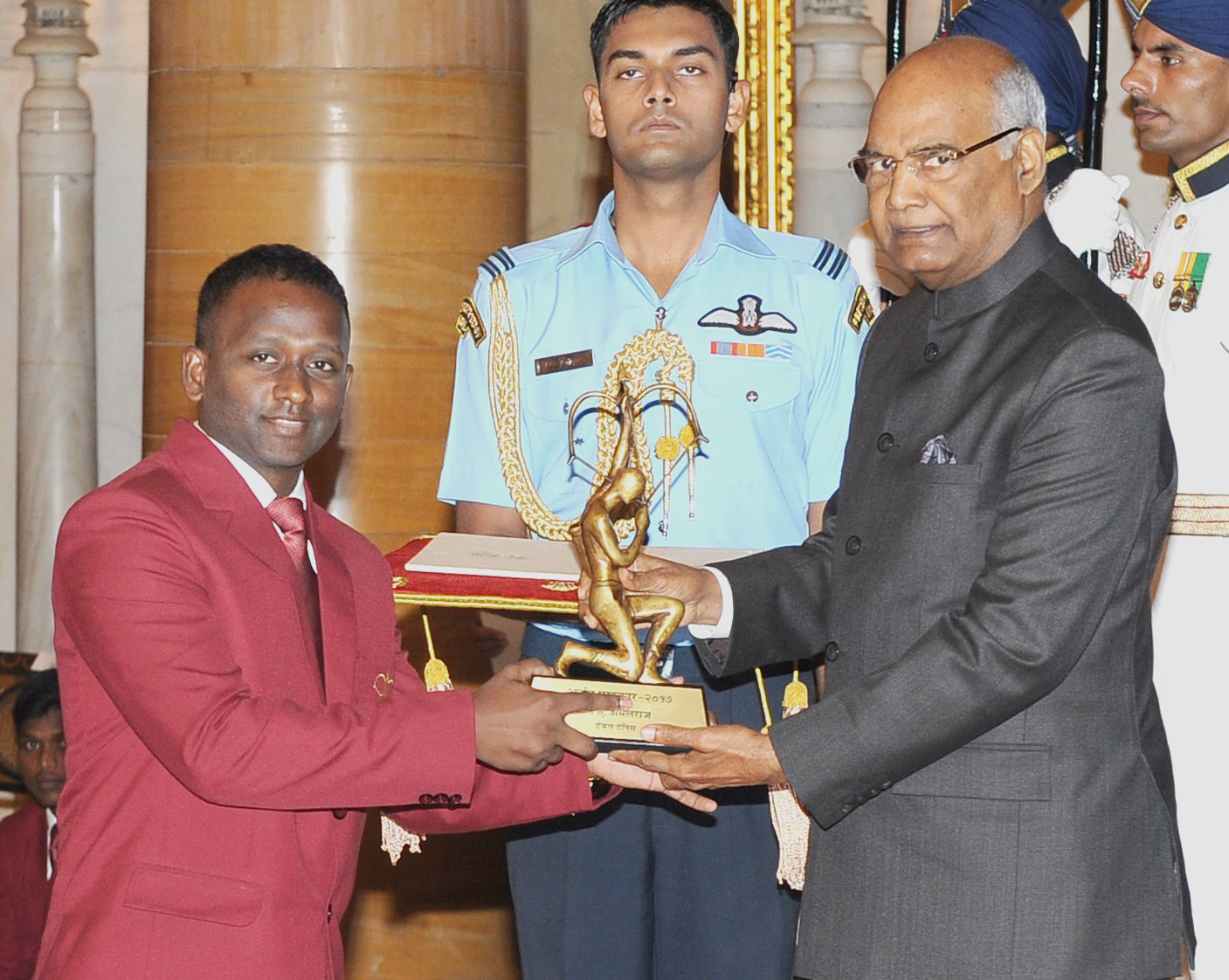
- The President, Shri Ram Nath Kovind presenting the Arjuna Award, 2017 to Shri A. Amalraj for Table Tennis, at Rashtrapati Bhavan, in New Delhi on August 29, 2017.

Personal information
- Full name: Amalraj Anthony Arputharaj
- Nationality: Indian
- Born: 24 January 1986 (age 40) Polur, Tamil Nadu, India
- Height: 1.6 m (5 ft 3 in)
- Weight: 64 kg (141 lb; 10.1 st)

Sport
- Sport: Table tennis
Medal record
Men's table tennis
Representing India
Commonwealth Games
Gold medal – first place	2018 Gold Coast	Men's team
Silver medal – second place	2014 Glasgow	Men's doubles
Asian Games
Bronze medal – third place	2018 Jakarta	Men's team
South Asian Games
Gold medal – first place	2016 Guwahati/Shillong	Men's singles
Gold medal – first place	2016 Guwahati/Shillong	Mixed doubles
Gold medal – first place	2016 Guwahati/Shillong	Men's team
Gold medal – first place	2019 Kathmandu/Pokhara	Men's singles
Gold medal – first place	2019 Kathmandu/Pokhara	Men's doubles
Gold medal – first place	2019 Kathmandu/Pokhara	Men's team
Silver medal – second place	2016 Guwahati/Shillong	Men's doubles
Silver medal – second place	2019 Kathmandu/Pokhara	Mixed doubles

Amalraj Anthony Arputharaj (born 24 January 1986) is a professional table tennis player from Tamil Nadu India. He won the silver medal at 2014 Commonwealth Games in doubles with Sharath Kamal.

Arputharaj won the National Table Tennis Championship in January 2012, beating the Indian legend, Sharath Kamal in the finals.

He won the Arjuna Awardee in 2017.

In 2018 Commonwealth Games held at Gold Coast, Australia, he won the gold medal in men's team event with Sharath Kamal, Harmeet Desai, Sathiyan Gnanasekaran & Sanil Shetty.

He won the gold medal in South Asian games 2019 in Men's Singles Table tennis tournament.

He spent about 8 years at PSPB National Academy in Ajmer for his training.
