= Kashish Malik =

Indian taekwondo athlete

Personal information
- Nationality: Indian
- Born: 4 July 2000 (age 26) Delhi
- Height: 1.7 m (5.6 ft)
- Weight: 57 kg (126 lb)

Sport
- Country: India
- Sport: Martial art
- Event: Taekwondo
Medal record
Women's taekwondo
Representing India
Asian Championships
Bronze medal – third place	2026 Ulaanbaatar	53 kg

Kashish Malik is an Indian taekwondo athlete from Delhi, India. She has represented India at the Asian Games in 2018 and reached till the Quarter-finals. She is training under Peace Taekwondo Academy and supported by the Virat Kohli Foundation.

Kashish started practising taekwondo at the age of 14 after a fight with a bully in her school which made Kashish pick up taekwondo for life.

== Tournaments Record ==
All Competition Results
Year	Event	Rank	Location	Place
2017	Fujaiarah Open	G1	Dubai United Arab Emirates	Bronze
2018	Kazakhstan Open	G1	Kazakhstan Kazakhstan	Silver
2018	Fujaiarah Open	G1	Dubai United Arab Emirates	Silver
2018	Malaysia Open	G1	Kuala Lumpur Malaysia	Gold
2018	Asian Games	G3	Jakarta Indonesia	Participation
2018	WT Presidents Cup - Asian	G2	Taipei China	Bronze
2019	South Asian Games	G4	Kathmandu NEP	Gold
2020	El Hassan Open	G1	Amman Jordan	Bronze

== See also ==
- Taekwondo in India
- Taekwondo at the 2019 South Asian Games
