= Arvind Panwar =

Indian cyclist

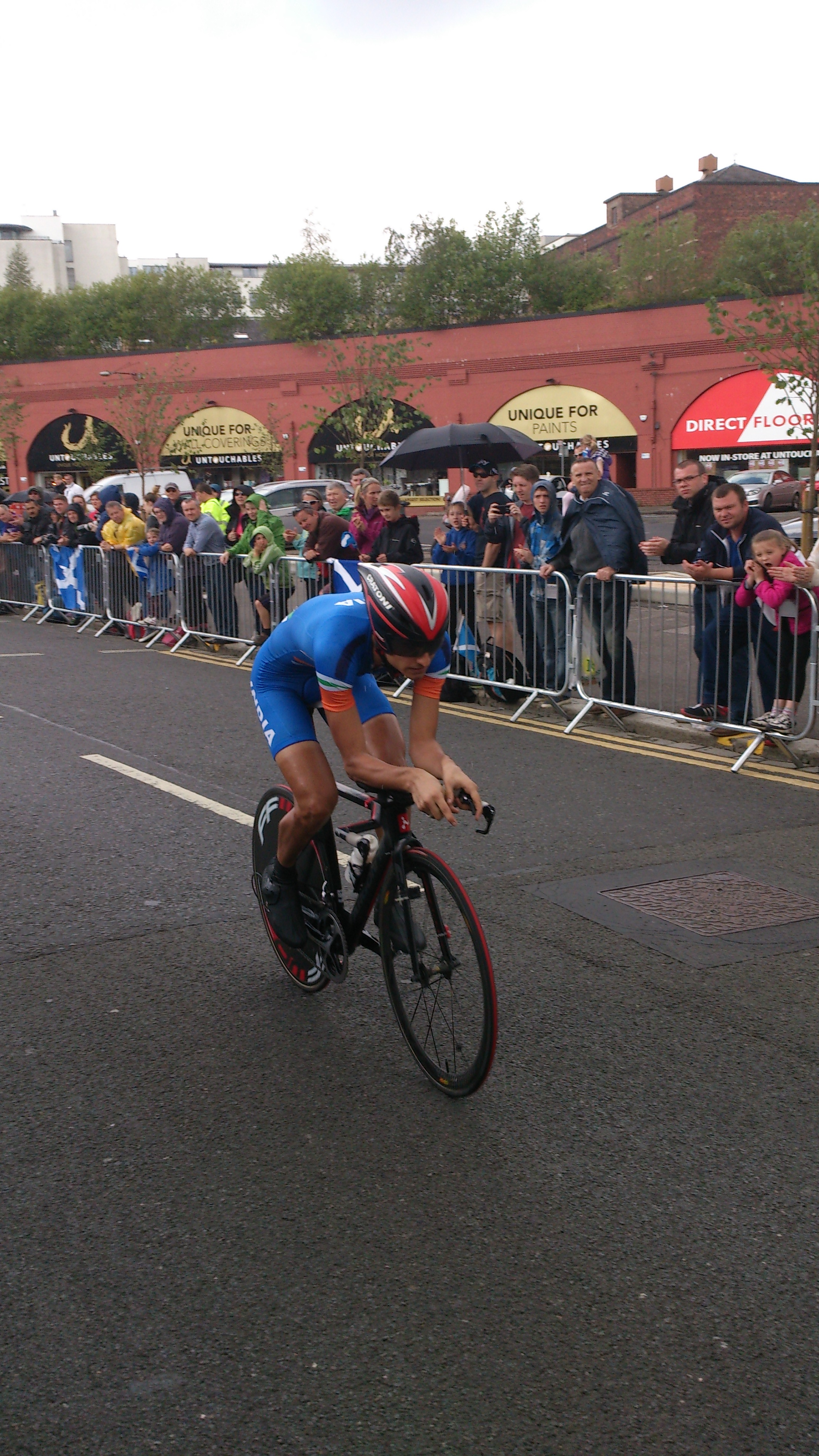
- Panwar at the 2014 Commonwealth Games

Personal information
- Born: 9 March 1990 (age 36) Meerut, India

Cycling career
- Sport: Cycling
- Discipline: Road
- Role: Rider
- Rider type: Time trialist

Amateur teams
- 2016: Kingsnorth International Wheelers
- 2017–2020: Asfra Racing Team Oudenaarde
- 2021: RSPB
- 2022: Uttar Pradesh
- 2023: RSPB

Arvind Panwar (born 9 March 1990) is an Indian road cyclist.

== Major results ==
2008
National Junior Road Championships

3rd Road race
3rd Time trial

2011
3rd Time trial, National Road Championships
2012
1st Road race, National Road Championships
2013
1st Time trial, National Road Championships
8th CFI International Race, Jaipur
2014
2nd Time trial, National Road Championships
2016
South Asian Games

1st Time trial
1st Team time trial

National Road Championships

1st Time trial
3rd Road race

9th Time trial, Asian Road Championships
2017
2nd Time trial, National Road Championships
2018
1st Time trial, National Road Championships
2019
2nd Time trial, South Asian Games
2nd Time trial, National Road Championships
7th Time trial, Asian Road Championships
2021
3rd Time trial, National Road Championships
