= Wrestling at the 2019 South Asian Games =

Wrestling at the 2019
- Venue: Janakpur Covered Hall
- Dates: 6–9 December 2019

Wrestling was one of the sports contested at the 2019 South Asian Games. The wrestling competition was hosted at the Janakpur Covered Hall, in Janakpur, Nepal from 6 to 9 December 2019.
