= Bhutan at the 2019 South Asian Games =

- IOC code: BHU
- NOC: Bhutan Olympic Committee

in Kathmandu and Pokhara, Nepal
- Medals Ranked 7th: Gold 0 Silver 7 Bronze 13 Total 20

South Asian Games appearances (overview)
- 1984; 1985; 1987; 1989; 1991; 1993; 1995; 1999; 2004; 2006; 2010; 2016; 2019; 2025

Bhutan is competed in the 2019 South Asian Games in Kathmandu and Pokhara, Nepal from 1 to 10 December 2019.

== Cricket ==
A 15-member team was selected for the games.

== Medal tally ==
Rank	Nation	Gold	Silver	Bronze	Total
1	Bhutan (BHU)	0	7	13	20
Totals (1 entries)		0	7	13	20
