= Bangladesh at the 2019 South Asian Games =

- IOC code: BAN
- NOC: Bangladesh Olympic Association

in Kathmandu and Pokhara, Nepal
- Competitors: 462 in 25 sports
- Medals Ranked 5th: Gold 19 Silver 33 Bronze 90 Total 142

South Asian Games appearances (overview)
- 1984; 1985; 1987; 1989; 1991; 1993; 1995; 1999; 2004; 2006; 2010; 2016; 2019; 2025

Bangladesh competed in the 2019 South Asian Games in Kathmandu and Pokhara, Nepal from 1 to 10 December 2019.

== Competitors ==
The following is a list of the number of competitors representing Bangladesh that participated at the Games:

Sport	Men	Women	Total
Archery			
Athletics			
Basketball			
Cricket	15	15	30
Volleyball	14	12	26
Football	20	0	20
Kabaddi			
Shooting			
Swimming			
Weightlifting			
Wrestling			
Total	263	199	462

== Medals by sports ==
Below is the list of medals won by Bangladesh in various events at the South Asian Games.

Games	Gold	Silver	Bronze	Total
Archery				
Athletics				
Badminton				
Boxing				
Cricket				
Fencing				
Football				
Golf				
Handball				
Judo				
Kabaddi				
Karate				
Kho-Kho				
Shooting				
Swimming				
Table Tennis				
Taekwondo				
Weightlifting				
Wrestling				
Wushu				
Total	19	33	90	142

== Athletics ==
A 24-member (14 men and 10 women) squad was announced for these Games.

== Football ==
Bangladesh Football Federation (BFF) announced that they would not be sending a women's team to these Games.

=== Men's tournament ===
Team	Event	Group Stage					Final / BM	
Team	Event	Opposition score	Opposition score	Opposition score	Opposition score	Rank	Opposition score	Rank
Bangladesh men's	Men's tournament	Bhutan L 0–1	Maldives; D 1–1	Sri Lanka; W 1–0	Nepal L 0–1	3rd		

Group stage

Pos	Team	Pld	W	D	L	GF	GA	GD	Pts	Qualification
1	Nepal (H)	4	3	1	0	8	2	+6	10	Advance to Final
2	Bhutan	4	3	0	1	6	5	+1	9	Advance to Final
3	Bangladesh	4	1	1	2	2	3	−1	4	
4	Maldives	4	0	2	2	3	5	−2	2	
5	Sri Lanka	4	0	2	2	1	5	−4	2	

Source: 2019 SAG Unogoal
Rules for classification: 1) points; 2) goal difference; 3) goals scored; 4) head-to-head result.
(H) Hosts

2 December 2019
13:00

Bangladesh	0−1	Bhutan
	Report	Gyeltshen 64'

Dasarath Rangasala Stadium, Kathmandu
Attendance: 500
Referee: Nabindra Maharjan (Nepal)

3 December 2019
17:30

Maldives	1−1	Bangladesh
I. Hossain 70'	Report	A. Ghanee 30' (o.g.)

Dasarath Rangasala Stadium, Kathmandu
Attendance: 450
Referee: Kabin Byanjankar (Nepal)

5 December 2019
17:30

Bangladesh	1-0	Sri Lanka
Sufil 11'	Report

Dasarath Rangasala Stadium, Kathmandu
Attendance: 100
Referee: Mohamed Javiz (Maldives)

8 December 2019
17:30

Nepal	1-0	Bangladesh
S. Bal 11'	Report

Dasarath Rangasala Stadium, Kathmandu
Attendance: 15,000
Referee: Rahul Kumar Gupta (India)
