= List of Olympians from Nepal =

This is list of players from Nepal who took part in the Olympics. The number of players in each Olympics is shown in graph below.

View source data.

== List ==
† Denotes flag bearer

Photo	Year	Hosting location	Name of athlete	Date of birth	Category/Event	Result	References
	2021	Tokyo Olympic 2020	Alexander Shah	29 October 2002	Swimming	Did not pass first round	
	2021	Tokyo Olympic 2020	Gaurika Singh†	26 November 2002	Swimming	Did not pass first round	
	2021	Tokyo Olympic 2020	Kalpana Pariyar	19 January 1995	Shooting	Did not pass first round	
	2021	Tokyo Olympic 2020	Soniya Bhatta	January 4, 2002	Judo	Did not pass first round	
	2021	Tokyo Olympic 2020	Sarswati Chaudhary	12 February 1997	100 m running	NA	
	2016	Brazil Olympic 2016	Jit Bahadur Muktan	31 August 1979	Archery	Did not pass first round	
	2016	Brazil Olympic 2016	Hari Kumar Rimal	13 June 1987	Marathon	Did not pass first round	
	2016	Brazil Olympic 2016	Saraswati Bhattarai	8 March 1994	Marathon	Did not pass first round	
	2016	Brazil Olympic 2016	Phupu Lhamu Khatri †	October 5, 1996	Judo	Did not pass first round	
	2016	Brazil Olympic 2016	Sirish Gurung	11 August 1998	Swimming	Did not pass first round	
	2016	Brazil Olympic 2016	Gaurika Singh	26 November 2002	Swimming	Did not pass first round	
	2012	London Olympic 2012	Tilak Ram Tharu	April 10, 1993	100 m running	Did not pass first round	
	2012	London Olympic 2012	Pramila Rijal	1 May 1985	100 m running	Did not pass first round	
	2012	London Olympic 2012	Sneh Rana	February 28, 1970	Shooting	Did not pass first round	
	2012	London Olympic 2012	Prasiddha Jung Shah †	3 June 1989	Swimming	Did not pass first round	
	2012	London Olympic 2012	Shreya Dhital	April 12, 1995	Swimming	Did not pass first round	
	2012	London Olympic 2012	Nisha Rawal	11 September 1995	Taekwondo	Did not pass first round	
	2008	Beijing Olympic 2008	Arjun Kumar Basnet	5 December 1975	Marathon	Did not pass first round	
	2008	Beijing Olympic 2008	Chandra Kala Thapa	September 2, 1980	100 m running	Did not pass first round	
	2008	Beijing Olympic 2008	Devu Thapa	5 December 1975	Judo	Did not pass first round	
	2008	Beijing Olympic 2008	Arjun Kumar Basnet	7 February 1974	Marathon	Did not pass first round	
	2008	Beijing Olympic 2008	Phool Maya Kyapchhaki	24 November 1980	Shooting	Did not pass first round	
	2008	Beijing Olympic 2008	Prasiddha Jung Shah	3 June 1989	Swimmer	Did not pass first round	
	2008	Beijing Olympic 2008	Karishma Karki	July 18, 1993	Swimming	Did not pass first round	
	2008	Beijing Olympic 2008	Deepak Bista †	2 July 1976	Taekwondo	Did not pass first round	
	2008	Beijing Olympic 2008	Kamal Bahadur Adhikari	July 20, 1977	Weight lifting	Did not pass first round	
	2004	Athens Olympic 2004	Rajendra Bahadur Bhandari †	14 November 1975	Marathon	Did not pass first round	
	2004	Athens Olympic 2004	Kanchhi Maya Koju	3 February 1981	Marathon	Did not pass first round	
	2004	Athens Olympic 2004	Tika Shrestha	2 September 1964	Shooting	Did not pass first round	
	2004	Athens Olympic 2004	Sangina Baidya	29 December 1974	Taekwondo	Did not pass first round	
	2004	Athens Olympic 2004	Alice Shrestha		Swimming	Did not pass first round	
	2004	Athens Olympic 2004	Nayana Shakya	10 May 1982	Swimming	Did not pass first round	
	2000	Sydney Olympic 2000	Gyan Bahadur Bohara	29 May 1969	Marathon	Did not pass first round	
	2000	Sydney Olympic 2000	Runa Pradhan	5 December 1984	Swimming	Did not pass first round	
	2000	Sydney Olympic 2000	Chitra Bahadur Gurung †	21 May 1970	Swimming	Did not pass first round	
	2000	Sydney Olympic 2000	Bhagawati Khatri	January 26, 1972	Shooting	Did not pass first round	
	2000	Sydney Olympic 2000	Devi Maya Paneru	25 August 1978	100 m running	Did not pass first round	
	1996	Atlanta Olympic 1996	Tika Bogati †	26 September 1962	Marathon	Did not pass first round	
	1996	Atlanta Olympic 1996	Bimala Ranamagar	2 July 1971	Marathon	Did not pass first round	
	1992	Barcelona Olympic 1992	Hari Bahadur Rokaya †	2 September 1965	Marathon	Did not pass first round	
	1988	Seoul Olympic 1988	Krishna Bahadur Basnet †	17 February 1959	Marathon	Did not pass first round	
	1988	Seoul Olympic 1988	Tika Bogati	26 September 1962	Marathon	Did not pass first round	
	1988	Seoul Olympic 1988	Dambar Singh Kuwar		100 m running	Did not pass first round	
	1988	Seoul Olympic 1988	Baikuntha Manandhar	December 24, 1951	Marathon	Did not pass first round	
	1988	Seoul Olympic 1988	Hari Bahadur Rokaya	2 September 1965	Marathon	Did not pass first round	
	1988	Seoul Olympic 1988	Dambar Singh Kuwar	1959	100 m running	Did not pass first round	
	1988	Seoul Olympic 1988	Raj Kumari Pandey	13 December 1969	Marathon	Did not pass first round	
	1988	Seoul Olympic 1988	Menuka Rawat	1972	Marathon	Did not pass first round	
	1988	Seoul Olympic 1988	Damber Dutta Bhatta	1970	Marathon	Did not pass first round	
	1988	Seoul Olympic 1988	Jhapat Singh Bhujel	1968	Boxing	Did not pass first round	
	1988	Seoul Olympic 1988	Ram Bahadur Giri	1960	Boxing	Did not pass first round	
	1988	Seoul Olympic 1988	Dalbahadur Ranamagar	1961	Boxing	Did not pass first round	
	1988	Seoul Olympic 1988	Bishnu Bahadur Singh	1969	Boxing	Did not pass first round	
	1988	Seoul Olympic 1988	Ganga Bahadur Dangol	1962	Judo	Did not pass first round	
	1988	Seoul Olympic 1988	Rishiram Pradhan	1962	Judo	Did not pass first round	
	1988	Seoul Olympic 1988	Parvati Thapa		Shooting	Did not pass first round	
	1988	Seoul Olympic 1988	Bharat Sawad	1968	Weight lifting	Did not pass first round	
	1984	Los Angeles Olympic 1984	Pushpa Raj Ojha	19 August 1959	400 m running	Did not pass first round	
	1984	Los Angeles Olympic 1984	Arjun Pandit	21 June 1959	Marathon	Did not pass first round	
	1984	Los Angeles Olympic 1984	Jodha Gurung	14 July 1954	400 m running	Did not pass first round	
	1984	Los Angeles Olympic 1984	Baikuntha Manandhar	December 24, 1951	Marathon	Did not pass first round	
	1984	Los Angeles Olympic 1984	Amiri Yadav	13 July 1959	Marathon	Did not pass first round	
	1980	Moscow Olympic 1980	Raghu Raj Onta	16 August 1952	100 m running	Did not pass first round	
	1980	Moscow Olympic 1980	Laxman Basnet	21 February 1957	Marathon	Did not pass first round	
	1980	Moscow Olympic 1980	Nara Bahadur Dahal	17 August 1960	Marathon	Did not pass first round	
	1980	Moscow Olympic 1980	Baikuntha Manandhar	December 24, 1951	Marathon	Did not pass first round	
	1980	Moscow Olympic 1980	Mukunda Hari Shrestha	14 December 1955	Marathon	Did not pass first round	
	1980	Moscow Olympic 1980	Rabi Raj Thapa	19 December 1953	Boxing	Did not pass first round	
	1980	Moscow Olympic 1980	Pushkardhoj Shahi	1959	Boxing	Did not pass first round	
	1980	Moscow Olympic 1980	Narendra Poma	19 March 1959	Boxing	Did not pass first round	
	1980	Moscow Olympic 1980	Bishnu Malakar	9 November 1959	Boxing	Did not pass first round	
	1976	Quebec Olympic 1976	Baikuntha Manandhar	December 24, 1951	Marathon	Did not pass first round	
	1972	Munic Olympic 1972	Jit Bahadur Khatri Chhetri	1947	Marathon	Did not pass first round	
	1972	Munic Olympic 1972	Bhakta Bahadur Sapkota	1947	Marathon	Did not pass first round	
	1964	Tokyo Olympic 1964	Bhupendra Silwal	17 November 1935	Marathon	Did not pass first round	
	1964	Tokyo Olympic 1964	Ganga Bahadur Thapa	1935	Marathon	Did not pass first round	
	1964	Tokyo Olympic 1964	Nam Singh Thapa †	August 8, 1946	Boxing	Did not pass first round	
	1964	Tokyo Olympic 1964	Bhim Bahadur Thapa	1944	Boxing	Did not pass first round	
	1964	Tokyo Olympic 1964	Ram Prasad Gurung	14 November 1945	Boxing	Did not pass first round	
	1964	Tokyo Olympic 1964	Om Prasad Pun	1942	Boxing	Did not pass first round	

== See also ==
- List of flag bearers for Nepal at the Olympics
- Nepal at the Olympics
