= List of flag bearers for Nepal at the Olympics =

Nepal at the Olympics
- IOC code: NEP
- NOC: Nepal Olympic Committee
- Website: www.nocnepal.org.np
- Medals: Gold 0 Silver 0 Bronze 0 Total 0

Summer appearances
- 1964; 1968; 1972; 1976; 1980; 1984; 1988; 1992; 1996; 2000; 2004; 2008; 2012; 2016; 2020; 2024

Winter appearances
- 2002; 2006; 2010; 2014; 2018–2026

This is a list of flag bearers who have represented Nepal at the Olympics.

Flag bearers carry the national flag of their country at the opening ceremony of the Olympic Games.

Event year	Season	Flag bearer	Sport	Ref
1964	Summer	Ram Prasad Gurung	Boxing	
1972	Summer	Jit Bahadur Khatri Chhetri	Athletics	
1976	Summer			
1980	Summer			
1984	Summer	Khadga Bahadur Ranabhat	Athletics (coach)	
1988	Summer	Krishna Bahadur Basnet	Athletics	
1992	Summer			
1996	Summer	Tika Bogati	Athletics	
2000	Summer	Chitra Bahadur Gurung	Swimming	
2002	Winter	Jay Khadka	Cross-country skiing	
2004	Summer	Rajendra Bahadur Bhandari	Athletics	
2006	Winter	Dachhiri Sherpa	Cross-country skiing	
2008	Summer	Deepak Bista	Taekwondo	
2010	Winter	Dachhiri Sherpa	Cross-country skiing	
2012	Summer	Prasiddha Jung Shah	Swimming	
2014	Winter	Dachhiri Sherpa	Cross-country skiing	
2016	Summer	Phupu Lhamu Khatri	Judo	
2020	Summer	Alexander Shah	Swimming	
2020	Summer	Gaurika Singh	Swimming	
2024	Summer	Manita Shrestha Pradhan	Judo	
2024	Summer	Santoo Shrestha	Table tennis	

== See also ==
- Nepal at the Olympics
- List of Olympic athletes of Nepal
