= List of Nepalese records in athletics =

The following are the national records in athletics in Nepal maintained by Nepal Athletics Association and Nepal Amateur Athletics Association (NAAA).

== Outdoor ==
Key to tables: Awaiting ratification Record not kept by NAAA Not ratified or later rescinded by NAAA

=== Men ===
Event	Record	Athlete	Date	Meet	Place	Ref.
100 m	10.71	Ram Krishna Chaudhari	26 September 1999	South Asian Games	Kathmandu, Nepal	
100 m	10.5 h	Tilak Ram Tharu	24 May 2011		Kathmandu, Nepal	
100 m	10.55	Shivaraj Parki	11 June 2022	9th National Games	Pokhara, Nepal	
200 m	21.87 (+1.9 m/s)	Aayush Kunwar	11 July 2026	Grand Sprint Series	Norwalk, United States	
200 m	21.5 h	Tilak Ram Tharu	24 February 2013	2nd Golden Sprint Meet	Kathmandu, Nepal	
400 m	48.32	Asha Ram Chaudhari	28 September 1990	Asian Games	Beijing, China	
400 m	47.95	Som Bahadur Kumal	18 October 2022	National Games	Pokhara, Nepal	
800 m	1:49.55	Som Bahadur Kumal	22 August 2026	Indian Open	Bhubaneswar, India	
1500 m	3:46.63	Gop Bahadur Adhikari	22 December 1993	South Asian Games	Dhaka, Bangladesh	
1500 m	3:46.38	Siddhant Adhikari	29 April 2016	Federation Cup	Delhi, India	
3000 m	8:23.59	Gyan Bahadur Bohara	15 October 1999		New Delhi, India	
3000 m	8:19.57	Mukesh Bahadur Pal	14 April 2026	2nd Pokhara Open Meet	Pokhara, Nepal	
5000 m	14:04.89	Rajendra Bahadur Bhandari	25 August 2004	Olympic Games	Athens, Greece	
5000 m	14:01.19	Rajendra Bahadur Bhandari	25 August 2006	South Asian Games	Colombo, Sri Lanka	
10,000 m	29:35.06	Deepak Adhikari	30 September 2023	Asian Games	Hangzhou, China	
10 km (road)	29:47	Anish Thapa	24 November 2019	Hyderabad 10K Run	Hyderabad, India	
15 km (road)	46:11+	Subas Gurung	6 July 2024	Gold Coast Half Marathon	Gold Coast, Australia	
20 km (road)	1:01:36+	Subas Gurung	6 July 2024	Gold Coast Half Marathon	Gold Coast, Australia	
Half marathon	1:04:55	Subas Gurung	6 July 2024	Gold Coast Half Marathon	Gold Coast, Australia	
Half marathon	1:04:35 a (Note: Mark was set at a race that has its start and finish lines separated by 63.03% of the race distance. To be record eligible, start and finish line must be separated by no more than 50%.)	Anish Thapa	8 December 2019	Vasai-Virar Mayor’s Marathon	Mumbai, India	
Marathon	2:15:03	Baikuntha Manandhar	22 November 1987	South Asian Games	Calcutta, India	
110 m hurdles	16.13	Dhirendra Chaudhari	7 February 2010	South Asian Games	Dhaka, Bangladesh	
400 m hurdles	53.23	Asha Ram Chaudhari	25 December 1993	South Asian Games	Dhaka, Bangladesh	
3000 m steeplechase	8:57.30	Rajendra Bahadur Bhandari	5 April 2004	South Asian Games	Islamabad, Pakistan	
3000 m steeplechase	8:55.19	Durga Bahadur Budha	17 October 2022	National Games	Pokhara, Nepal	
High jump	1.98 m	Surya Khatri	12 July 2015	Nepalese Team's Time Trial	Kathmandu, Nepal	
Pole vault	3.85 m	Rudra Bhattarai	16 September 1994		Kathmandu, Nepal	
Long jump	7.32 m (−0.9 m/s)	Salim Dewan	10 August 2025	1st Indian Open World Athletics Continental Tour	Bhuwaneswar, India	
Triple jump	15.20 m	Sita Ram Chaudhari	25 July 2001		Kathmandu, Nepal	
Shot put	13.92 m	Ujr Singh Bista	26 September 1999	South Asian Games	Kathmandu, Nepal	
Discus throw	40.68 m	Chabi Ram Shrestha	23 March 1999		Nepalgunj, Nepal	
Hammer throw	47.66 m	Tanka Thapamagar	12 July 1999		Kathmandu, Nepal	
Javelin throw	70.39 m	Khursed Ahmed Khan	29 September 1999	South Asian Games	Kathmandu, Nepal	
Decathlon	5355 pts (ht)	Dambar Singh Kuwar	27–28 September 1987		Pokhara, Nepal	
Decathlon	100m (wind) / Long jump (wind) / Shot put / High jump / 400m / 110m H (wind) / Discus / Pole vault / Javelin / 1500m; 11.9 / 5.84 m / 10.02 m / 1.78 m / 53.7 / 16.5 / 27.68 m / 2.80 m / 34.08 m / 4:37.1					
20 km walk (road)	1:40:48	Ganga Bahadur Shahi	10 January 1997		Chandragadhi, Nepal	
50 km walk (road)						
4 × 100 m relay	41.17	Nepal; Lila Shrestha; Suresh Pandey; Ram Krishna Chaudhari; Govinda Thapa	23 December 1995	South Asian Games	Madras, India	
4 × 400 m relay	3:14.89	Nepal; Dhani Ram Chaudhari; Lila Shrestha; Prem Mahat; Khem Bahadur Khatri	29 September 1999	South Asian Games	Kathmandu, Nepal	

=== Women ===
Event	Record	Athlete	Date	Meet	Place	Ref.
100 m	12.19	Devi Maya Paneru	26 September 1999	South Asian Games	Kathmandu, Nepal	
200 m	25.00	Devi Maya Paneru	28 September 1999	South Asian Games	Kathmandu, Nepal	
400 m	59.57	Tulasa Khatri	22 October 2019	Military World Games	Wuhan, China	
400 m	58.1 h	Ramita Kumari Tharu	18 October 2022	National Games	Pokhara, Nepal	
800 m	2:11.05	Raj Kumari Pandey	23 October 1989	South Asian Games	Islamabad, Pakistan	
1500 m	4:33.94	Saraswati Bhattarai	12 August 2016	Olympic Games	Rio de Janeiro, Brazil	
3000 m	9:48.14	Raj Kumari Pandey	1 October 1990	Asian Games	Beijing, China	
5000 m	16:36.61	Santoshi Shrestha	24 October 2025	South Asian Championships	Ranchi, India	
10,000 m	34:47.77	Santoshi Shrestha	26 October 2025	South Asian Championships	Ranchi, India	
Half marathon	1:15:07	Santoshi Shrestha	12 October 2025	Vedanta Delhi Half Marathon	New Delhi, India	
25 km (road)	1:34:17+	Santoshi Shrestha	7 December 2025	Valencia Marathon	Valencia, Spain	
30 km (road)	1:53:21+	Santoshi Shrestha	7 December 2025	Valencia Marathon	Valencia, Spain	
Marathon	2:55:57	Kanchhi Maya Koju	24 September 2016		Kathmandu, Nepal	
Marathon	2:50:11 (Note: short distance)	Puspa Bhandari	7 December 2019	South Asian Games	Kathmandu, Nepal	
Marathon	2:48:02	Pushpa Bhandari	20 January 2023	Bangabandhu International Marathon	Dhaka, Bangladesh	
Marathon	2:46:26	Santoshi Shrestha	26 January 2024	Bangabandhu International Marathon	Dhaka, Bangladesh	
Marathon	2:40:23	Santoshi Shrestha	7 December 2025	Valencia Marathon	Valencia, Spain	
100 m hurdles	17.61 (−0.2 m/s)	Keshari Chaudhari	5 July 2013	Asian Championships	Pune, India	
100 m hurdles	17.5 h	Sabita Chaudhary	27 February 2012	6th National Games	Dhangadhi, Nepal	
100 m hurdles	15.9 h	Keshari Chaudhari	10 April 2013	National Games	Kathmandu, Nepal	
100 m hurdles	15.2 h NWI (Note: by World Athletics source; 15.16 by other sources)	Jayarani Tharu	17 October 2022	National Games	Pokhara, Nepal	
400 m hurdles	1:10.78	Chandra Kala Kamat	24 July 1987	Asian Championships	Singapore	
400 m hurdles	1:07.7 h	Sabita Chaudhary	2012	National Games		
400 m hurdles	1:07.2 h	Jayarani Tharu	25 June 2022	Nepalese Championships	Kathmandu, Nepal	
400 m hurdles	1:04.2 h	Jayarani Tharu	16 October 2022	National Games	Pokhara, Nepal	
3000 m steeplechase						
High jump	1.69 m	Keshari Chaudhari	7 February 2010	South Asian Games	Dhaka, Bangladesh	
Pole vault						
Long jump	5.36 m	Keshari Chaudhari	10 April 2013	National Games	Kathmandu, Nepal	
Long jump	5.58 m NWI	Jayarani Tharu	18 October 2022	National Games	Pokhara, Nepal	
Triple jump	12.20 m	Keshari Chaudhari	11 April 2013	National Games	Kathmandu, Nepal	
Shot put	11.56 m	Chandra Kala Lamgade	24 December 2016	National Games	Itahari, Nepal	
Discus throw	40.31 m	Amrita Mahato	8 September 2015	Thailand Open	Bangkok, Thailand	
Hammer throw						
Javelin throw	43.94 m	Chandra Kala Lamgade	25 December 2016	National Games	Itahari, Nepal	
Heptathlon	2596 pts h	Padma Chaudhari	1–2 February 1990		Birgunj, Nepal	
Heptathlon	100m H (wind) / High jump / Shot put / 200m (wind) / Long jump (wind) / Javelin / 800m					
Heptathlon	2980 pts	Chandra Kala Kamat	28–29 March 1984		Pokhara, Nepal	
Heptathlon	100m H (wind) / High jump / Shot put / 200m (wind) / Long jump (wind) / Javelin / 800m					
20 km walk (road)						
50 km walk (road)						
4 × 100 m relay	49.13	Nepal; Bina Shrestha; Samigya Shakya; Susmita Thapa; Devi Maya Paneru	29 September 1999	South Asian Games	Kathmandu, Nepal	
4 × 400 m relay	4:02.5 h	Army; Krishna Chaudhary; Tulasa Khatri; Sangita Meche; Saraswati Bhattarai	21 April 2019	National Games	Dang, Nepal	

== Indoor ==
=== Men ===
Event	Record	Athlete	Date	Meet	Place	Ref.
60 m	7.02	Aayush Kunwar	10 February 2024	Whitworth Invitational	Spokane, United States	
200 m	22.79	Aayush Kunwar	10 February 2024	Whitworth Invitational	Spokane, United States	
300 m	39.47	Rojit Gurung	8 January 2019	Middlesex League Indoor Meet #5	Boston, United States	
400 m						
600 m	1:25.83	Bishow Thapa	12 February 2023	NHIAA Division II Indoor State Championships	Hanover United States	
800 m	1:51.46	Som Bahadur Kumal	6 February 2026	Asian Championships	Tianjin, China	
1500 m	3:54.29	Mukesh Bahadur Pal	6 February 2026	Asian Championships	Tianjin, China	
3000 m						
60 m hurdles	11.04	Shrestha Santosh Kumar	31 October 2007	Asian Indoor Games	Macau	
High jump						
Pole vault						
Long jump	5.68 m (Note: not recognized by World Athletics)	Rojit Gurung	3 January 2020	Middlesex League Indoor Meet #3	Boston, United States	
Triple jump						
Shot put						
Heptathlon						
Heptathlon	60m / Long jump / Shot put / High jump / 60m H / Pole vault / 1000m					
5000 m walk						
4 × 400 m relay						

=== Women ===
Event	Record	Athlete	Date	Meet	Place	Ref.
60 m						
200 m						
400 m						
800 m						
1500 m	4:46.13	Chchaya Khathri	31 October 2007	Asian Indoor Games	Macau	
3000 m	10:33.77	Nirmala Bharati	13 November 2005	Asian Indoor Games	Pattaya, Thailand	
60 m hurdles						
High jump						
Pole vault						
Long jump						
Triple jump						
Shot put						
Pentathlon						
Pentathlon	60m H / High jump / Shot put / Long jump / 800m					
3000 m walk						
4 × 400 m relay						
