= Nepal at the 1988 Summer Olympics =

- IOC code: NEP
- NOC: Nepal Olympic Committee

in Seoul
- Competitors: 16 in 5 sports
- Flag bearer: Krishna Bahadur Basnet
- Medals: Gold 0 Silver 0 Bronze 0 Total 0

Summer Olympics appearances (overview)
- 1964; 1968; 1972; 1976; 1980; 1984; 1988; 1992; 1996; 2000; 2004; 2008; 2012; 2016; 2020; 2024

Nepal competed at the 1988 Summer Olympics in Seoul, South Korea. Bidhan Lama, won a bronze medal in taekwondo which was then an exhibition sport.

== Competitors ==
The following is the list of number of competitors in the Games.

Sport	Men	Women	Total
Athletics	5	2	7
Boxing	5	–	5
Judo	2	–	2
Shooting	0	1	1
Weightlifting	1	–	1
Total	13	3	16

== Athletics ==
=== Men ===
==== Track events ====
Athlete	Events	Heat		Semifinal		Final	
Athlete	Events	Time	Position	Time	Position	Time	Position
Krisnaba Basnyat	Marathon					2:47:57	85
Teeka Bogate	Marathon					2:31:49	66
Dambar Kunwar	110m Hurdles	16.51	40	Did not advance			
Dambar Kunwar	400m Hurdles	56.80	37	Did not advance			
Baikuntha Manandhar	Marathon					2:25:57	54
Haribahadur Rokaya	1500m	4:01.17	53	Did not advance			
Haribahadur Rokaya	5000m	14:53.75	48	Did not advance			
Haribahadur Rokaya	10,000m	30:48.16	38	Did not advance			

==== Combined events ====
Athlete	Event		Result	Points	Rank
Dambar Kunwar	Decathlon	100 m	12.12	628	30
Dambar Kunwar	Decathlon	Long jump	5.83	550	37
Dambar Kunwar	Decathlon	Shot put	9.71	468	37
Dambar Kunwar	Decathlon	High jump	1.70	544	37
Dambar Kunwar	Decathlon	400 m	52.32	711	28
Dambar Kunwar	Decathlon	110 m hurdles	17.05	619	34
Dambar Kunwar	Decathlon	Discus throw	27.10	408	34
Dambar Kunwar	Decathlon	Pole vault	2.80	309	32
Dambar Kunwar	Decathlon	Javelin throw	39.10	429	34
Dambar Kunwar	Decathlon	1500 m	4:41.24	673	22
Dambar Kunwar	Decathlon	Final	—N/a	5339	34

=== Women ===
==== Track events ====
Athlete	Events	Heat		Semifinal		Final	
Athlete	Events	Time	Position	Time	Position	Time	Position
Rajkumari Pandey	Marathon					3:10:31	60
Menuka Rawat	Marathon					3:11:17	61

== Boxing ==
Athlete	Event	Round of 64	Round of 32	Round of 16	Quarterfinals	Semifinals	Final
Athlete	Event	Opposition Result	Opposition Result	Opposition Result	Opposition Result	Opposition Result	Opposition Result
Dambardut Ta Bhatta	Light Flyweight	Epton (GBR); L 0:5	Did not advance				
Jhapat Singh Bhujel	Light Welterweight	Mphande (MAW); L 0:5	Did not advance				
Giri Rambahadur	Bantamweight		Mwema (KEN); L RSCH	Did not advance			
Dalbahadur Ranamagar	Lightweight	Hegazy (EGY); L 0:5	Did not advance				
Bishnubahadur Singh	Flyweight	Espenola (PAR); W 5:0	Johnson (USA); L RSCH	Did not advance			

== Judo ==
Men

Athlete	Event	Round of 32	Round of 16	Quarterfinals	Semifinals	First Repechage Round	Repechage Quarterfinals	Repechage Semifinals	Final
Athlete	Event	Opposition Result	Opposition Result	Opposition Result	Opposition Result	Opposition Result	Opposition Result	Opposition Result	Opposition Result
Gangabahadur Dangol	−71kg	Gueorgui Tenadze (URS); L 0100-0000	Did not advance						
Rishiram Pradhan	−65kg	Petřikov (TCH); L 0200-0000	Did not advance						

== Shooting ==
Women

Athlete	Event	Qualification		Final		Rank
Athlete	Event	Score	Rank	Score	Total	Rank
Parbati Thapa	10m Air Rifle	375	43	Did not advance		43

== Weightlifting ==
Men

Athlete	Event	Snatch		Clean & jerk		Total	Rank
Athlete	Event	Result	Rank	Result	Rank	Total	Rank
Bharat Sawad	Flyweight	75 kg	24	105 kg	21	180 kg	22
