= Nepal at the 1984 Summer Olympics =

- IOC code: NEP
- NOC: Nepal Olympic Committee

in Los Angeles
- Competitors: 10
- Flag bearer: Khadga Ranabhat
- Medals: Gold 0 Silver 0 Bronze 0 Total 0

Summer Olympics appearances (overview)
- 1964; 1968; 1972; 1976; 1980; 1984; 1988; 1992; 1996; 2000; 2004; 2008; 2012; 2016; 2020; 2024

Nepal was represented at the 1984 Summer Olympics in Los Angeles, California, United States by the Nepal Olympic Committee.

In total, 10 athletes – all men – represented Nepal in three different sports including athletics, boxing and weightlifting.

== Background ==
One Nepalese athlete had competed at the 1924 Winter Olympics in Chamonix, France in what was the first time the country would be represented at any Olympics. The Nepal Olympic Committee was founded in 1962 and Nepal made their Summer Olympic debut at the 1964 Summer Olympics in Tokyo, Japan. They missed the 1968 Summer Olympics in Mexico City, Mexico but had competed at every subsequent Summer Olympics. The 1984 Summer Olympics in Los Angeles, California, United States marked their fourth consecutive appearance and their fifth appearance overall at the Summer Olympics.

== Competitors ==
In total, 10 athletes represented Nepal at the 1984 Summer Olympics in Los Angeles, California, United States across three different sports.

Sport	Men	Women	Total
Athletics	5	0	5
Boxing	4	—	4
Wrestling	2	—	2
Total	10	0	10

== Athletics ==
In total, five Nepalese athletes participated in the athletics events – Jodha Gurung in the men's 800 m, Pushpa Raj Ojha in the men's 400 m and Baikuntha Manandhar, Arjun Pandit and Amira Prasad Yadal in the men's marathon.

== Boxing ==
In total, four Nepalese athletes participated in the boxing events – Umesh Maskey in the light welterweight category, Dal Bahadur Ranamagar in the Lightweight category, Manoj Bahadur Shrestha in the Welterweight category and Prabin Tuladhar in the flyweight category.

== Weightlifting ==
In total, two Nepalese athletes participated in the weightlifting events – Surendra Hamal in the –67.5 kg category and Jagadish Pradhan in the –56 kg category.
