= Nepal at the 1980 Summer Olympics =

- IOC code: NEP
- NOC: Nepal Olympic Committee

in Moscow
- Competitors: 13
- Medals: Gold 0 Silver 0 Bronze 0 Total 0

Summer Olympics appearances (overview)
- 1964; 1968; 1972; 1976; 1980; 1984; 1988; 1992; 1996; 2000; 2004; 2008; 2012; 2016; 2020; 2024

Nepal competed at the 1980 Summer Olympics in Moscow, USSR.

== Results by event ==
=== Athletics ===
Men's 100 metres

- Raghuraj Onta

- Heat — 11.61 (→ did not advance)

Men's 5,000 metres

- Laxman Basnet

- Heat — 16:11.7 (→ did not advance)

Men's 10,000 metres

- Narbahadur Dahal (otherwise Nara Bahadur Dahal)

- Heat — 31:19.8 (→ did not advance)

Men's Marathon

- Baikuntha Manandhar

- Final — 2:23:51 (→ 37th place)

- Mukundahari Shrestha

- Final — 2:38:52 (→ 45th place)

=== Boxing ===
Men's Flyweight (51 kg)

- Rabiraj Thapa
  1. First Round — Bye
  2. Second Round — Lost to János Váradi (Hungary) after referee stopped contest in first round

Men's Bantamweight (54 kg)

- Pushkardhoj Shahi
  1. First Round — Bye
  2. Second Round — Lost to Ali ben Maghenia (France) walk-over

Men's Featherweight (57 kg)

- Narendra Poma
  1. First Round — Bye
  2. Second Round — Lost to Sidnei Dalrovere (Brazil) after referee stopped contest in first round

Men's Light-Welterweight (63,5 kg)

- Bishnu Malakar
  1. First Round — Lost to Ryu Bun-Hwa (North Korea) after referee stopped contest in first round
