= Nepal at the 2004 Summer Olympics =

- IOC code: NEP
- NOC: Nepal Olympic Committee
- Website: www.nocnepal.org.np

in Athens
- Competitors: 6 in 4 sports
- Flag bearer: Rajendra Bahadur Bhandari
- Medals: Gold 0 Silver 0 Bronze 0 Total 0

Summer Olympics appearances (overview)
- 1964; 1968; 1972; 1976; 1980; 1984; 1988; 1992; 1996; 2000; 2004; 2008; 2012; 2016; 2020; 2024

Nepal competed at the 2004 Summer Olympics in Athens, Greece, from 13 to 29 August 2004.

== Athletics ==
Nepali athletes have so far achieved qualifying standards in the following athletics events (up to a maximum of 3 athletes in each event at the 'A' Standard, and 1 at the 'B' Standard).

Men

Athlete	Event	Heat		Final	
Athlete	Event	Result	Rank	Result	Rank
Rajendra Bahadur Bhandari	5000 m	14:04.89 NR	18	did not advance	

Women

Athlete	Event	Heat		Semifinal		Final	
Athlete	Event	Result	Rank	Result	Rank	Result	Rank
Kanchhi Maya Koju	1500 m	4:38.17	15	did not advance			

Key

- Note–Ranks given for track events are within the athlete's heat only
- Q = Qualified for the next round
- q = Qualified for the next round as a fastest loser or, in field events, by position without achieving the qualifying target
- NR = National record
- N/A = Round not applicable for the event
- Bye = Athlete not required to compete in round

== Shooting ==
Men

Athlete	Event	Qualification		Final	
Athlete	Event	Points	Rank	Points	Rank
Tika Shrestha	10 m air rifle	579	46	did not advance	

== Swimming ==
Men

Athlete	Event	Heat		Semifinal		Final	
Athlete	Event	Time	Rank	Time	Rank	Time	Rank
Alice Shrestha	100 m breaststroke	1:12.25	59	did not advance			

Women

Athlete	Event	Heat		Semifinal		Final	
Athlete	Event	Time	Rank	Time	Rank	Time	Rank
Nayana Shakya	100 m breaststroke	1:32.92	47	did not advance			

== Taekwondo ==
Nepal has qualified a single taekwondo jin.

Athlete	Event	Round of 16	Quarterfinals	Semifinals	Repechage 1	Repechage 2	Final / BM	
Athlete	Event	Opposition Result	Opposition Result	Opposition Result	Opposition Result	Opposition Result	Opposition Result	Rank
Sangina Baidya	Women's −49 kg	Chen S-H (TPE); L 0–4	did not advance		Mora (COL); L (−1)–5	did not advance		7

== See also ==
- Nepal at the 2002 Asian Games
- Nepal at the 2004 Summer Paralympics
