= Nepal at the 2000 Summer Olympics =

- IOC code: NEP
- NOC: Nepal Olympic Committee
- Website: www.nocnepal.org.np

in Sydney
- Flag bearer: Chitra Bahadur Gurung
- Medals: Gold 0 Silver 0 Bronze 0 Total 0

Summer Olympics appearances (overview)
- 1964; 1968; 1972; 1976; 1980; 1984; 1988; 1992; 1996; 2000; 2004; 2008; 2012; 2016; 2020; 2024

Nepal competed at the 2000 Summer Olympics in Sydney, Australia.

== Athletics ==
Key

- Q = Qualified for the next round by position in race or, in field events, by achieving the automatic qualification target
- q = Qualified for the next round as a fastest loser or, in field events, by position without achieving the qualifying target

Track and road events

Athlete	Event	Heat		Quarterfinal		Semifinal		Final	
Athlete	Event	Time	Rank	Time	Rank	Time	Rank	Time	Rank
Gyan Bahadur Bohara	Men's 5000 m	14:34.15	34	—N/a				Did not advance	
Devi Maya Paneru	Women's 100 m	12.74	70	Did not advance					

== Shooting ==
Athlete	Event	Qualification		Final		Total	
Athlete	Event	Points	Rank	Points	Rank	Points	Rank
Bhagawati Khatri	Women's 10 m air rifle	386	43	Didn ot advance			

== Swimming ==
Athlete	Event	Heat		Semifinal		Final	
Athlete	Event	Time	Rank	Time	Rank	Time	Rank
Chitra Bahadur Gurung	Men's 50 m freestyle	27.02	69	Did not advance			
Runa Pradhan	Women's 50 m freestyle	31.28	66	Did not advance			
