= Nepal Athletics Association =

National governing body for Athletics sport in Nepal

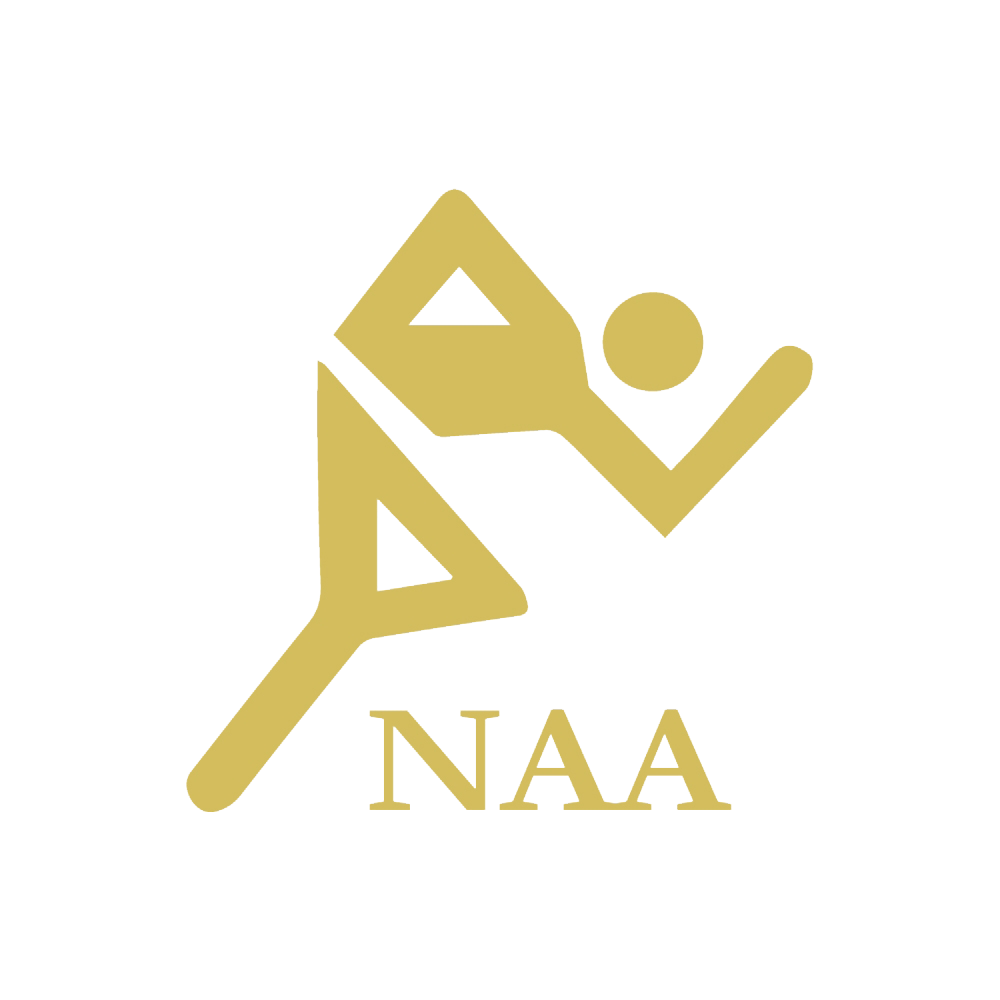
- Sport: Athletics
- Jurisdiction: (Nepal) National
- Abbreviation: NAA
- Founded
- Affiliation: World Athletics
- Regional affiliation: Asian Athletics Association
- Headquarters: Kathmandu, Nepal
- President: Rajeev Bikram Shah
- Vice president(s): Sanjib Tuladhar; Sushil Narsingh Rana
- Secretary: Sunil Rajbanshi

Official website
- nepalathletics.org.np
- (Nepal)

The Nepal Athletics Association (NAA) is the national governing body for the sport of athletics in Nepal, and is responsible for conducting competitions in the country. It is affiliated to World Athletics and the Asian Athletics Association (AAA).

It was formerly called the Nepal Amateur Athletics Association (NAAA). Nepal Athletics Association (NAA) organized the 16th edition of the Asian Cross Country Championship.

== See also ==
- Sports in Nepal – Overview of sports in Nepal
- List of Nepalese records in athletics
- Baikuntha Manandhar
- Tilak Ram Tharu
- Santoshi Shrestha
- Devi Maya Paneru
