= Nepal at the 2008 Summer Olympics =

- IOC code: NEP
- NOC: Nepal Olympic Committee
- Website: www.nocnepal.org.np

in Beijing
- Competitors: 8 in 5 sports
- Flag bearer: Deepak Bista
- Medals: Gold 0 Silver 0 Bronze 0 Total 0

Summer Olympics appearances (overview)
- 1964; 1968; 1972; 1976; 1980; 1984; 1988; 1992; 1996; 2000; 2004; 2008; 2012; 2016; 2020; 2024

Nepal competed in the 2008 Summer Olympics which were held in Beijing, People's Republic of China from August 8 to August 24, 2008. The country was represented by eight athletes, who competed in judo, shooting, swimming and taekwondo.

This was the nation's first Olympic appearance as a new republic following the civil war which the monarchy rule was ceased to exist in 2006.

== Athletics ==
Men

Athlete	Event	Final	
Athlete	Event	Result	Rank
Arjun Kumar Basnet	Marathon	2:23:09	45

Women

Athlete	Event	Heat		Quarterfinal		Semifinal		Final	
Athlete	Event	Result	Rank	Result	Rank	Result	Rank	Result	Rank
Chandra Kala Thapa	100 m	13.15	9	Did not advance					

Key

- Note–Ranks given for track events are within the athlete's heat only
- Q = Qualified for the next round
- q = Qualified for the next round as a fastest loser or, in field events, by position without achieving the qualifying target
- NR = National record
- N/A = Round not applicable for the event
- Bye = Athlete not required to compete in round

== Judo ==
Athlete	Event	Round of 32	Round of 16	Quarterfinals	Semifinals	Repechage 1	Repechage 2	Repechage 3	Final / BM	
Athlete	Event	Opposition Result	Opposition Result	Opposition Result	Opposition Result	Opposition Result	Opposition Result	Opposition Result	Opposition Result	Rank
Devu Thapa	Women's −63 kg	Bye	Wang C-F (TPE); L 0000–1000	Did not advance						

== Shooting ==
Women

Athlete	Event	Qualification		Final	
Athlete	Event	Points	Rank	Points	Rank
Phool Maya Kyapchhaki	10 m air rifle	380	46	Did not advance	

== Swimming ==
Men

Athlete	Event	Heat		Semifinal		Final	
Athlete	Event	Time	Rank	Time	Rank	Time	Rank
Prasiddha Jung Shah	50 m freestyle	27.59	81	Did not advance			

Women

Athlete	Event	Heat		Semifinal		Final	
Athlete	Event	Time	Rank	Time	Rank	Time	Rank
Karishma Karki	50 m freestyle	32.35	81	Did not advance			

== Taekwondo ==
Athlete	Event	Round of 16	Quarterfinals	Semifinals	Repechage	Bronze Medal	Final	
Athlete	Event	Opposition Result	Opposition Result	Opposition Result	Opposition Result	Opposition Result	Opposition Result	Rank
Deepak Bista	Men's −80 kg	Saei (IRI); L 0–7	Did not advance		Zhu G (CHN); L 2–6	Did not advance		

== Weightlifting ==
Athlete	Event	Snatch		Clean & Jerk		Total	Rank
Athlete	Event	Result	Rank	Result	Rank	Total	Rank
Kamal Bahadur Adhikari	Men's −69 kg	114	28	154	22	268	22

== See also ==
- List of Olympic athletes of Nepal
