= Nepal Judo Association =

Judo federation

- Sport: Judo
- Jurisdiction: (Nepal) National
- Abbreviation: NJA
- Founded: 1983; 42 years ago
- Affiliation: IJF
- Affiliation date: 1983
- Regional affiliation: JUA
- Headquarters: Dasharath Stadium, Tripureswor, Kathmandu
- President: Deepak Harsha Bajracharya
- Vice president(s): Dharamsheela Chapagai
- Secretary: Prakash Chandra Pandey

Official website
- nepaljudoassociation.org.np
- (Nepal)

The Nepal Judo Association (NJA) is the national sports body for judo in Nepal. Founded in 1983, NJA is affiliated with the International Judo Federation (IJF) and the Judo Union of Asia (JUA). The association is headquartered at Dasharath Stadium in Kathmandu.

NJA has been instrumental in promoting judo across the country, organizing national and international competitions, and nurturing talented judokas. Notable Nepalese judokas include Soniya Bhatta and Ganga Bahadur Dangol.

== History ==
In 1969 AD Judo was first introduced to Nepal Police. Mr. Ichizo Shakairi from Japan coached Nepal Police Judokas, Mr. Shakairi is considered as the first professional judo coach in Nepal.

After gaining few popularity, Mr.Bishnu Gopal Shrestha and his team registered Nepal Judo Association under NSC in 1983 AD. Now it is affiliated to Judo Union of Asia and International Judo Federation.

In 2016, IJF organized Judo for the world- Nepal series to help the 2015 earthquake victims.

== Notable Nepalese Judokas ==
- Mohan Bam
- Devu Thapa
- Soniya Bhatta
- Ganga Bahadur Dangol
- Manita Shrestha Pradhan
- Phupu Lhamu Khatri
