= Nepal at the 2016 Summer Olympics =

- IOC code: NEP
- NOC: Nepal Olympic Committee
- Website: www.nocnepal.org.np

in Rio de Janeiro
- Competitors: 7 in 5 sports
- Flag bearer: Phupu Lhamu Khatri
- Officials: 59
- Medals: Gold 0 Silver 0 Bronze 0 Total 0

Summer Olympics appearances (overview)
- 1964; 1968; 1972; 1976; 1980; 1984; 1988; 1992; 1996; 2000; 2004; 2008; 2012; 2016; 2020; 2024; 2028

Nepal competed at the 2016 Summer Olympics in Rio de Janeiro, Brazil, from 5 to 21 August 2016. This was the nation's thirteenth consecutive appearance at the Summer Olympics, although it failed to register any athletes in 1968.

The Nepal Olympic Committee selected a team of seven athletes, three men and four women, across five different sports at the Games; all of them made their Olympic debut in Rio de Janeiro through wild card entries and universality places, without having qualified. Among the nation's athletes were taekwondo fighter Nisha Rawal (women's +67 kg), London-based backstroke swimmer Gaurika Singh, who etched her name into the history records by becoming the youngest Olympian of the Games (aged 13), and judoka Phupu Lhamu Khatri, who also created history as the first female athlete to carry the Nepalese flag in the opening ceremony.

Nepal, however, has yet to win its first-ever Olympic medal. Unable to reach the final, Rawal bounced back from her early elimination in the opening match to produce a seventh-place feat as the best result for the Nepalis at the Games, losing the repechage bout to former world champion and 2008 bronze medalist Gwladys Épangue of France.

== Archery ==
Nepal has received an invitation from the Tripartite Commission to send a male archer to the Olympic tournament, signifying the nation's Olympic debut in the sport.

Athlete	Event	Ranking round		Round of 64	Round of 32	Round of 16	Quarterfinals	Semifinals	Final / BM	
Athlete	Event	Score	Seed	Opposition Score	Opposition Score	Opposition Score	Opposition Score	Opposition Score	Opposition Score	Rank
Jit Bahadur Moktan	Men's individual	607	60	Das (IND); L 0–6	Did not advance					

== Athletics ==
Nepal has received an invitation from the Tripartite Commission to send two track and field athletes (one male and one female) to the Olympics.

Key

- Note–Ranks given for track events are within the athlete's heat only
- Q = Qualified for the next round
- q = Qualified for the next round as a fastest loser or, in field events, by position without achieving the qualifying target
- NR = National record
- N/A = Round not applicable for the event
- Bye = Athlete not required to compete in round

Track & road events

Athlete	Event	Heat		Semifinal		Final	
Athlete	Event	Result	Rank	Result	Rank	Result	Rank
Hari Rimal	Men's 5000 m	14:54.42	23	—N/a		Did not advance	
Saraswati Bhattarai	Women's 1500 m	4:33.94	13	Did not advance			

== Judo ==
Nepal has received an invitation from the Tripartite Commission to send a judoka competing in the women's half-middleweight category (63 kg), signifying the nation's Olympic return to the sport after an eight-year hiatus.

Athlete	Event	Round of 32	Round of 16	Quarterfinals	Semifinals	Repechage	Final / BM	
Athlete	Event	Opposition Result	Opposition Result	Opposition Result	Opposition Result	Opposition Result	Opposition Result	Rank
Phupu Lhamu Khatri	Women's −63 kg	Espinosa (CUB); L 000–011	Did not advance					

== Swimming ==
Nepal has received a Universality invitation from FINA to send two swimmers (one male and one female) to the Olympics.

Athlete	Event	Heat		Semifinal		Final	
Athlete	Event	Time	Rank	Time	Rank	Time	Rank
Sirish Gurung	Men's 100 m freestyle	57.76 NR	58	Did not advance			
Gaurika Singh	Women's 100 m backstroke	1:08.45	31	Did not advance			

== Taekwondo ==
Nepal received an invitation from the Tripartite Commission to send Nisha Rawal in the women's heavyweight category (+67 kg) into the Olympic taekwondo competition, signifying the nation's Olympic return to the sport after an eight-year hiatus.

Athlete	Event	Round of 16	Quarterfinals	Semifinals	Repechage	Final / BM	
Athlete	Event	Opposition Result	Opposition Result	Opposition Result	Opposition Result	Opposition Result	Rank
Nisha Rawal	Women's +67 kg	Zheng Sy (CHN); L 0–2	Did not advance		Épangue (FRA); L 3–4	Did not advance	7

== See also ==
- List of Olympic athletes of Nepal
