= NSSA =

NSSA may refer to:

- National Scholastic Surfing Association
- National School Sailing Association, formed in the UK in 1961
- National Security Space Association
- National Space Science Agency
- National Sportscasters and Sportswriters Association, now National Sports Media Association
- National Skeet Shooting Association
- Nepal Skating and Skateboarding Association
- North-South Skirmish Association
- OSPF Not-So-Stubby Area
