= Nepal at the 1996 Summer Olympics =

- IOC code: NEP
- NOC: Nepal Olympic Committee
- Website: www.nocnepal.org.np

in Atlanta
- Competitors: 6 in 4 sports
- Flag bearer: Tika Bogati
- Medals: Gold 0 Silver 0 Bronze 0 Total 0

Summer Olympics appearances (overview)
- 1964; 1968; 1972; 1976; 1980; 1984; 1988; 1992; 1996; 2000; 2004; 2008; 2012; 2016; 2020; 2024

Nepal competed at the 1996 Summer Olympics in Atlanta, United States.

== Results by event ==
=== Athletics ===
Men's Marathon

- Tika Bogati → 74th place (2:27:04)

Women's Marathon

- Bimala Rana Magar → 62nd place (3:16:19)
