= Nepal at the 2020 Summer Olympics =

- Flag of Nepal
- IOC code: NEP
- NOC: Nepal Olympic Committee
- Website: www.nocnepal.org.np

in Tokyo, Japan July 23, 2021 – August 8, 2021
- Competitors: 5 in 4 sports
- Flag bearers (opening): Gaurika Singh; Alexander Shah
- Flag bearer (closing): N/A
- Medals: Gold 0 Silver 0 Bronze 0 Total 0

Summer Olympics appearances (overview)
- 1964; 1968; 1972; 1976; 1980; 1984; 1988; 1992; 1996; 2000; 2004; 2008; 2012; 2016; 2020; 2024

Nepal, represented by the Nepal Olympic Committee (NOC), competed at the 2020 Summer Olympics in Tokyo. Originally scheduled to take place from 24 July to 9 August 2020, the Games were postponed to 23 July to 8 August 2021, because of the COVID-19 pandemic. Nepalese athletes have appeared in every Summer Olympics since 1964, with the exception of 1968.

== Competitors ==
The following is the list of number of competitors in the Games.

Sport	Men	Women	Total
Athletics	0	1	1
Judo	0	1	1
Shooting	0	1	1
Swimming	1	1	2
Total	1	4	5

== Athletics ==
Nepal received a universality slot from the World Athletics to send a female track and field athlete to the Olympics.

Key

- Note–Ranks given for track events are within the athlete's heat only
- Q = Qualified for the next round
- q = Qualified for the next round as a fastest loser or, in field events, by position without achieving the qualifying target
- NR = National record
- N/A = Round not applicable for the event
- Bye = Athlete not required to compete in round

Track & road events

Athlete	Event	Heat		Quarterfinal		Semifinal		Final	
Athlete	Event	Result	Rank	Result	Rank	Result	Rank	Result	Rank
Sarswati Chaudhary	Women's 100 m	12.91 SB	8	Did not advance					

== Judo ==
Nepal received an invitation from the Tripartite Commission and the International Judo Federation to send Soniya Bhatta in the women's extra-lightweight category (48 kg) to the Olympics.

Athlete	Event	Round of 32	Round of 16	Quarterfinals	Semifinals	Repechage	Final / BM	
Athlete	Event	Opposition Result	Opposition Result	Opposition Result	Opposition Result	Opposition Result	Opposition Result	Rank
Soniya Bhatta	Women's –48 kg	Dolgova (ROC); L 00–10	Did not advance					

== Shooting ==
Nepal received an invitation from the Tripartite Commission to send a women's air rifle shooter to the Olympics, as long as the minimum qualifying score (MQS) was fulfilled by June 5, 2021.

Athlete	Event	Qualification		Final	
Athlete	Event	Points	Rank	Points	Rank
Kalpana Pariyar	Women's 10 m air rifle	616.8	46	Did not advance	

== Swimming ==
Nepal received a universality invitation from FINA to send two top-ranked swimmers (one per gender) in their respective individual events to the Olympics, based on the FINA Points System of June 28, 2021.

Athlete	Event	Heat		Semifinal		Final	
Athlete	Event	Time	Rank	Time	Rank	Time	Rank
Alexander Shah	Men's 100 m freestyle	53.41	59	Did not advance			
Gaurika Singh	Women's 100 m freestyle	1:00.11	50	Did not advance			

== See also ==
- List of Olympic athletes of Nepal
