= Nepal at the 1964 Summer Olympics =

- IOC code: NEP
- NOC: Nepal Olympic Committee

in Tokyo
- Competitors: 6 in 2 sports
- Flag bearer: Ram Prasad Gurung
- Medals: Gold 0 Silver 0 Bronze 0 Total 0

Summer Olympics appearances (overview)
- 1964; 1968; 1972; 1976; 1980; 1984; 1988; 1992; 1996; 2000; 2004; 2008; 2012; 2016; 2020; 2024

Nepal competed in the Summer Olympic Games for the first time at the 1964 Summer Olympics in Tokyo, Japan.

== Results by event ==
=== Athletics ===
Marathon

- Bahadur Bhupendra - did not finish
- Bahadur Thapa Ganga - did not finish

=== Boxing ===
Flyweight

- Thapa Namsing - eliminated in the round of 16

Featherweight

- Thapa Bhim Bahadur - eliminated in the round of 32

Lightweight

- Gurung Ram Prasad - eliminated in the round of 32

Light welterweight

- Pun Om Prasad - eliminated in the round of 16
