= Nepal at the 2012 Summer Olympics =

- IOC code: NEP
- NOC: Nepal Olympic Committee
- Website: www.nocnepal.org.np

in London
- Competitors: 5 in 3 sports
- Flag bearer: Prasiddha Jung Shah
- Medals: Gold 0 Silver 0 Bronze 0 Total 0

Summer Olympics appearances (overview)
- 1964; 1968; 1972; 1976; 1980; 1984; 1988; 1992; 1996; 2000; 2004; 2008; 2012; 2016; 2020; 2024; 2028

Nepal competed at the 2012 Summer Olympics in London, which was held from 27 July to 12 August 2012. The country's participation at London marked its twelfth appearance in the Summer Olympics since its début at the 1964 Summer Olympics. The delegation included two track and field athletes; Tilak Ram Tharu and Pramila Rijal, one shooter Sneh Rana and two swimmers; Prasiddha Jung Shah and Shreya Dhital; all five competitors qualified for the Games through wildcard places from their respective sporting governing bodies. It was the smallest delegation sent by Nepal since the 1992 Summer Olympics. Shah was selected as the flag bearer for the opening and closing ceremonies. Four of the five athletes were unable to progress beyond the first stages of their respective events while Rana finished 54th in the women's 10 metre air rifle shooting competition.

== Background ==
Nepal participated in twelve Olympic Games between its début at the 1964 Summer Olympics in Tokyo, Japan and the 2012 Summer Olympics in London, England, with the exception of 1968. No Nepalese athlete has ever won a medal at the Summer Olympics and the country has entered four Winter Olympic Games. Nepal participated in the Summer Olympics from 27 July to 12 August 2012. The Nepalese delegation to these Olympics consisted of athletes Tilak Ram Tharu and Pramila Rijal, shooter Sneh Rana and swimmers Prasiddha Jung Shah and Shreya Dhital. It was the nation's smallest delegation since the 1992 Summer Olympics. Jung Shah was the flag bearer for both the opening and closing ceremonies.

Along with the five athletes, the country's delegation by its chef de mission Ganga Bahadur Thapa, secretary general Jeevan Ram Shrestha, the NOC president Dhruba Bahadur Pradhan, and the competitors were coached by Tika Sedain (athletics) and Ongden Iama (swimming). Yuva Raj Lama, the National Sports Council member secretary, withdrew from the delegation because of a disagreement over the selection of athletes and accused the NOC of being unable to maintain transparency over funds to the International Olympic Committee. The team trained in the English county of Kent in a deal announced in July 2011, and were primarily based at Canterbury Christ Church University and The Canterbury Academy.

== Athletics ==
Tilak Ram Tharu was the sole male competitor in athletics to represent Nepal at the London Olympic Games. He had not participated in any previous Olympic Games. Tharu qualified for the Games by using a wildcard because his fastest time of eleven seconds at the 2011 World Championships in Athletics was 0.76 seconds slower than the "B" qualifying standard for the men's 100 metres. He said that he did not expect to get the chance to take part in the Olympic Games and set himself the objective of recording a new Nepalese national record. Tharu spent two months training in Nepal alongside his period in Kent. He was drawn in the fourth heat in the preliminary round on 4 August, finishing fifth out of eight athletes, with a time of 10.85 seconds. Overall Tharu finished 59th out of 75 competitors overall, and did not advance to the later stages because he was 0.23 seconds slower than the slowest athlete in his heat who progressed to the first round. He was unable to obtain the Nepalese national record but stated his faster time was a positive although he felt Nepal required better training facilities.

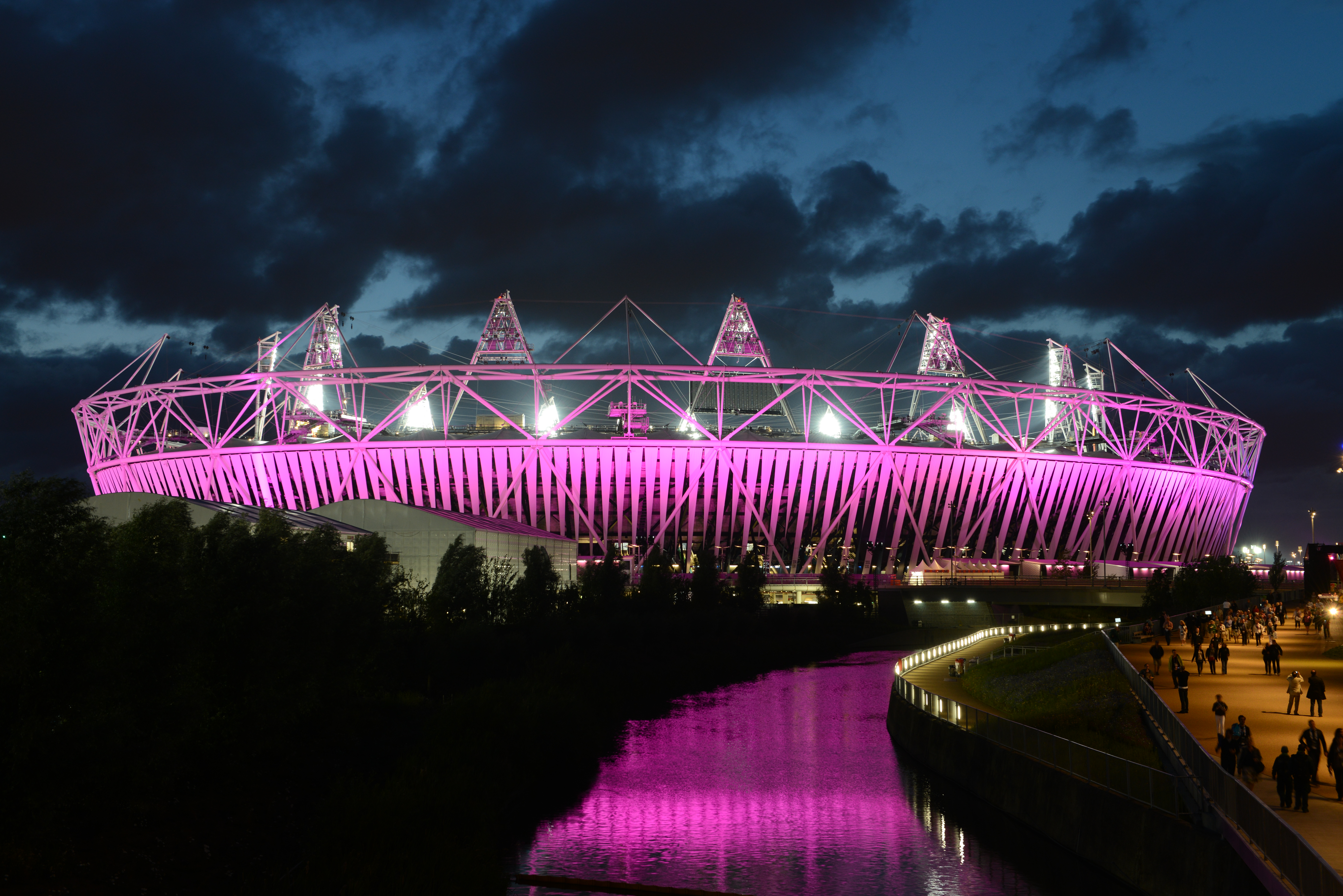
The London Olympic Stadium, where Tharu and Rijal competed in track and field events.

Competing at her first Summer Olympic Games, Pramila Rijal was the oldest person to compete for Nepal at the London Olympics at age 27. She attained qualification to the Games with the use of a wildcard because she had not set any previous time for the women's 100 metres. Rijal revealed that she had problems with the starting block but hoped the training in Kent would aid her in setting a new Nepalese national record. She took part in the fourth heat on 3 August, finishing sixth out of nine competitors, with a time of 13.33 seconds. The result was attributed to Rajal having back pain in the days before the event and required painkillers to help her cope. She finished 71st out of 78 runners overall, (Note: One athlete, Noor Hussain Al-Malki, was unable to finish, and another, Semoy Hackett, was disqualified.) and was eliminated from the event since only the first three finishers of each heat and the following ten quickest qualified for the next round.

Men

Athlete	Event	Heat		Quarterfinal		Semifinal		Final	
Athlete	Event	Result	Rank	Result	Rank	Result	Rank	Result	Rank
Tilak Ram Tharu	100 m	10.85	5	Did not advance					

Women

Athlete	Event	Heat		Quarterfinal		Semifinal		Final	
Athlete	Event	Result	Rank	Result	Rank	Result	Rank	Result	Rank
Pramila Rijal	100 m	13.33	6	Did not advance					

Key

- Note–Ranks given for track events are within the athlete's heat only

== Shooting ==
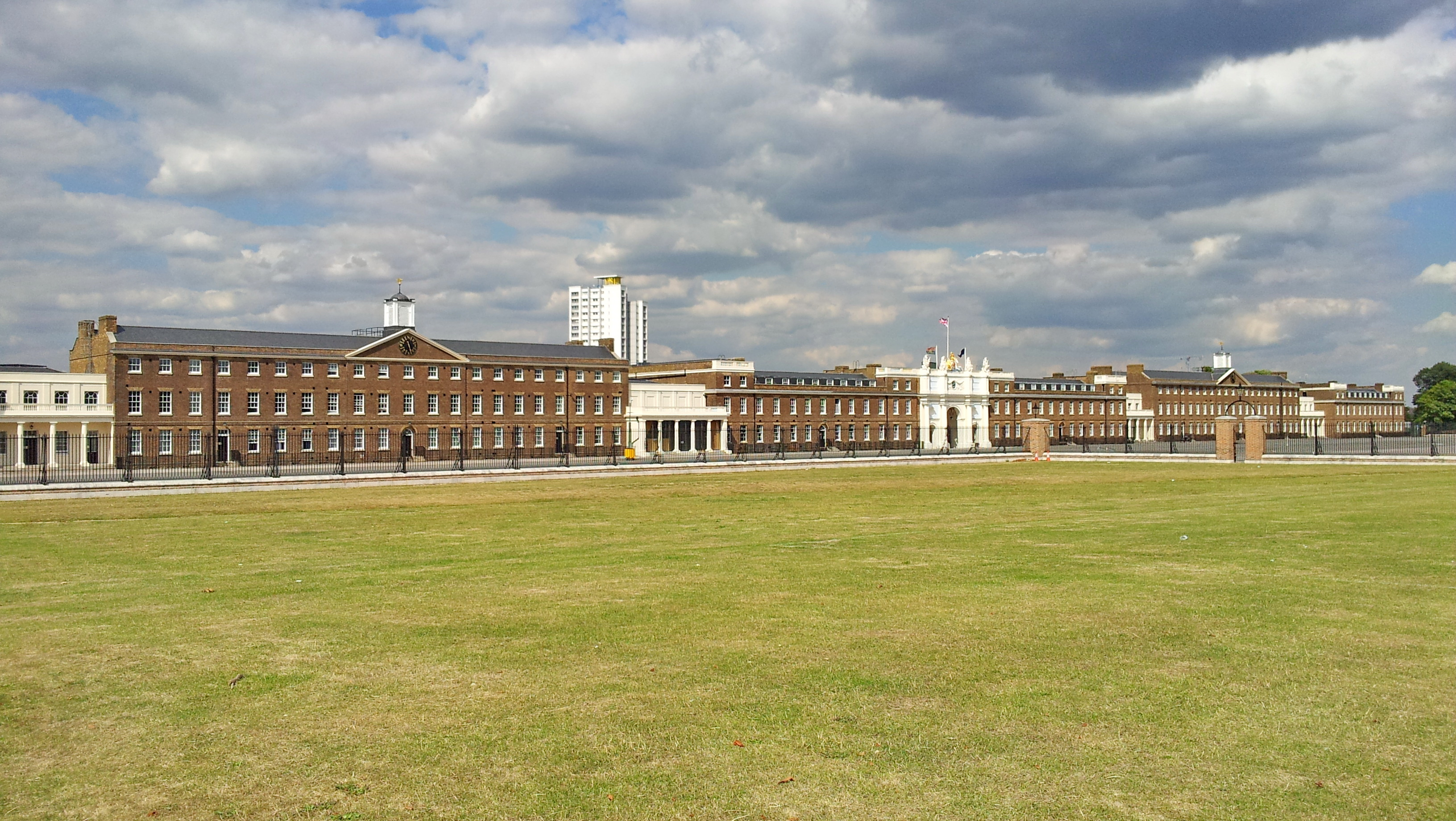
The Royal Artillery Barracks, where Rana took part in the women's 10 metre air rifle competition.

Sneh Rana was her nation's sole representative in shooting at the London Games. She was 19 years old at the time and was making her début in the quadrennial event. Rana qualified for the women's 10 metres air rifle shooting competition after receiving a wildcard from shooting's Olympic governing body, the International Shooting Sport Federation, because of a re-allocation of unused quota places. On 28 July she competed in the qualification round of her event. Rana finished 54th out of 56 athletes with a score of 54 points. Rana scored 16 points less than the two equal highest scoring competitors, Sylwia Bogacka of Poland and Yi Siling from China. She scored 14 points less than the four lowest scoring qualifiers for the final and therefore her competition ended at the qualifying round. After the Games Rana said the event was "great exposure" for herself and that it was "an amazing experience".

Women

Athlete	Event	Qualification		Final	
Athlete	Event	Points	Rank	Points	Rank
Sneh Rana	10 m air rifle	383	54	Did not advance	

== Swimming ==
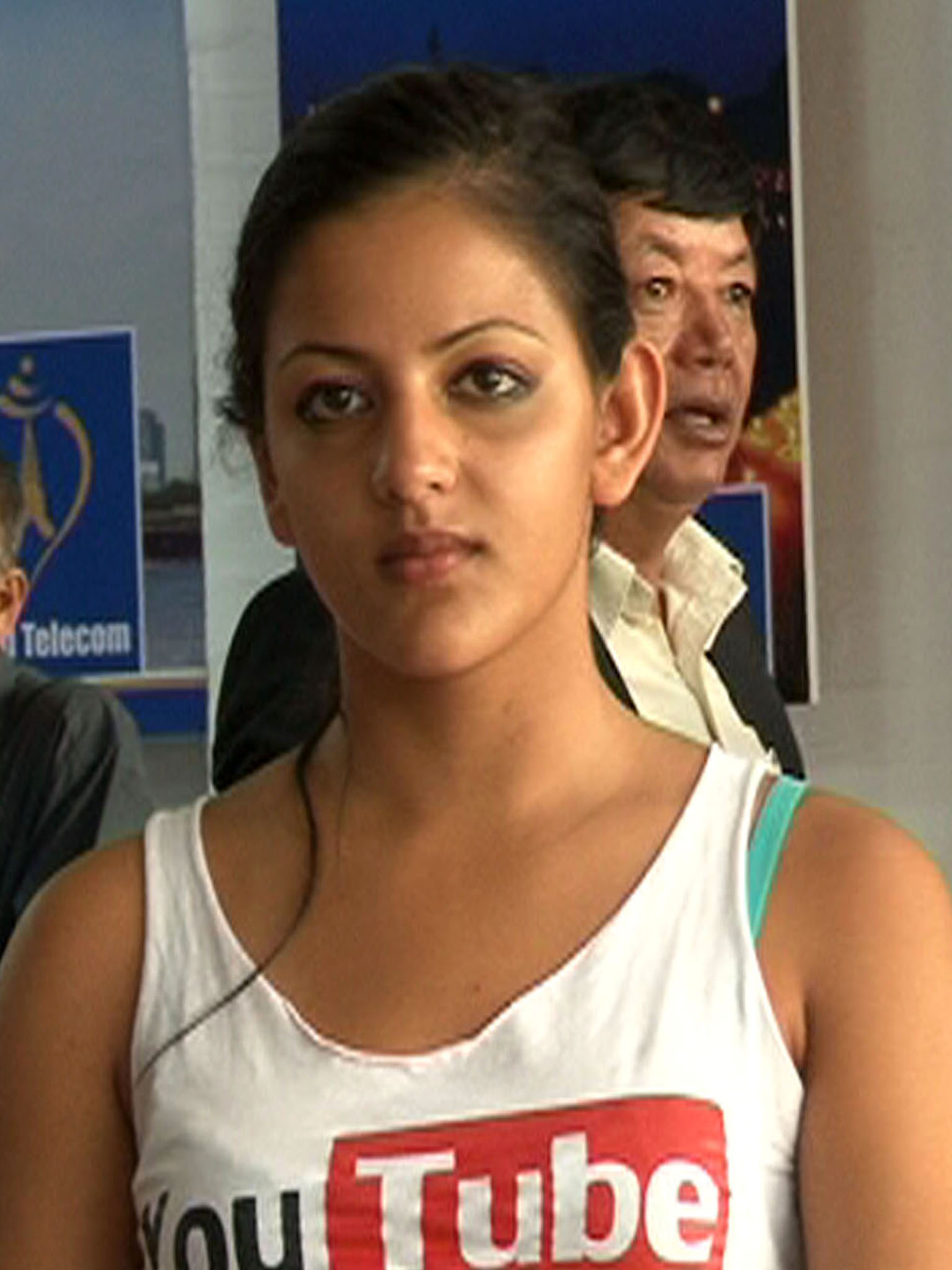
Shreya Dhital took part in the women's 100 metre freestyle where she was eliminated in the heat stages.

Making his second appearance at the Summer Olympics at the age of 23, Jung Shah was notable for carrying the flag of Nepal at the opening and closing ceremonies. He qualified for the Games by receiving a universality place from swimming's world governing body FINA because his fastest time of 27.30 seconds, set at the 2011 World Aquatics Championships, was 4.57 seconds slower than the "B" qualifying standard for the men's 50 metres freestyle. Shah sustained a minor shoulder injury heading during his training sessions going into the event but recovered and stated that he wanted to attempt to improve on his personal best time. He participated in the event's third heat on 2 August, finishing seventh out of eight swimmers, with a time of 26.93 seconds. Shah finished 47th out of 58 competitors overall, and did not advance into the semi-final because he was 4.66 seconds behind the slowest swimmer who made the later stages. Despite setting a new personal best time Shah said he was disappointed with his performance.

Competing in her first Olympic Games, Shreya Dhital was the youngest person to represent Nepal in the quadrennial event at the age of 17. She attained qualification into the Games by gaining a universality place from FINA because her fastest time of 1 minute, 10.82 seconds was 14.28 seconds slower than the "B" qualifying standard for the women's 100 metre freestyle. In an interview with The Kathmandu Post before the Games Dhital said that she was confident about achieving a new national Nepalese swimming record. She was drawn in the event's first heat on 1 August, finishing second out of three competitors, with a time of one minute, 10.80 seconds. The swimmer's time was a new national Nepalese record. Dhital finished 47th out of 48 swimmers overall, (Note: Two swimmers, Cate Campbell and Therese Alshammar, did not start.) and was unable to progress to the semi-finals after placing 16.37 seconds slower than the slowest athlete who advanced to the later stages. Following the heat's completing Dhital said that the achievement would help her improve her performance in the future.

Men

Athlete	Event	Heat		Semifinal		Final	
Athlete	Event	Time	Rank	Time	Rank	Time	Rank
Prasiddha Jung Shah	50 m freestyle	26.93	47	Did not advance			

Women

Athlete	Event	Heat		Semifinal		Final	
Athlete	Event	Time	Rank	Time	Rank	Time	Rank
Shreya Dhital	100 m freestyle	1:10.80	47	Did not advance			

== See also ==
- Nepal at the 2012 Summer Paralympics
- List of Olympic athletes of Nepal
