= Nepal at the 1972 Summer Olympics =

- IOC code: NEP
- NOC: Nepal Olympic Committee

in Munich
- Flag bearer: Jit Bahadur Khatri Chhetri
- Medals: Gold 0 Silver 0 Bronze 0 Total 0

Summer Olympics appearances (overview)
- 1964; 1968; 1972; 1976; 1980; 1984; 1988; 1992; 1996; 2000; 2004; 2008; 2012; 2016; 2020; 2024

Nepal competed at the 1972 Summer Olympics in Munich, West Germany.

== Athletics ==
Men's Marathon:

- Jit Bahadur — 2:57:58.8 (→ 60th place)
- Bhakta Bahadur — did not finish (→ no ranking)
