= Dambar (name) =

Dambar is a Nepalese given name. Notable people with the name include:

- Dambar Singh Kuwar (born 1959), Nepalese athlete
- Dambar Shah (died 1645), King of Gorkha Kingdom
- Dambar Shumsher Rana (1858–1922), Nepalese general
- Dambar Bahadur Budaprithi a.k.a. Louis Banks (born 1941)
