= Nepal at the 2024 Summer Olympics =

- Flag of Nepal
- IOC code: NEP
- NOC: Nepal Olympic Committee
- Website: www.nocnepal.org.np

in Paris, France 26 July 2024 – 11 August 2024
- Competitors: 7 (3 men and 4 women) in 6 sports
- Flag bearers: Santoo Shrestha & Manita Shrestha Pradhan
- Medals: Gold 0 Silver 0 Bronze 0 Total 0

Summer Olympics appearances (overview)
- 1964; 1968; 1972; 1976; 1980; 1984; 1988; 1992; 1996; 2000; 2004; 2008; 2012; 2016; 2020; 2024

Nepal competed at the 2024 Summer Olympics in Paris, France, from 26 July to 11 August 2024. It was the nation's fifteenth appearances at the Summer Olympics, since the official debut in 1964. Nepal has never won a single Olympic medal in its Olympics history. Nepal failed to win a medal at Paris Olympics 2024.

== Competitors ==
The following is the list of number of competitors in the Games.

Sport	Men	Women	Total
Athletics	0	1	1
Badminton	1	0	1
Judo	0	1	1
Shooting	0	1	1
Swimming	1	1	2
Table tennis	1	0	1
Total	3	4	7

== Athletics ==
Nepali track and field athletes qualified for Paris 2024, by receiving the direct universality spots in the following event:

Key

- Note–Ranks given for track events are within the athlete's heat only
- Q = Qualified for the next round
- q = Qualified for the next round as a fastest loser or, in field events, by position without achieving the qualifying target
- NR = National record
- N/A = Round not applicable for the event
- Bye = Athlete not required to compete in round

Track and road events

Athlete	Event	Final	
Athlete	Event	Result	Rank
Santoshi Shrestha	Women's marathon	2:55:06	79

== Badminton ==
Nepal entered one badminton players into the Olympic tournament. Prince Dahal secured his spots after receiving the allocations of universality spots; signifying the nations debut at these sports.

Athlete	Event	Group stage				Elimination	Quarter-final	Semi-final	Final / BM	
Athlete	Event	Opposition Score	Opposition Score	Opposition Score	Rank	Opposition Score	Opposition Score	Opposition Score	Opposition Score	Rank
Prince Dahal	Men's singles	Axelsen (DEN); L (8–21, 6–21)	Nguyen (IRL); L (7–21, 5–21)	Zilberman (ISR); L (12–21, 10–21)	4	Bye	Did not advance			

== Judo ==
Nepal qualified one judoka for the following weight class at the Games. Manita Shrestha Pradhan (women's lightweight, 57 kg) got qualified via continental quota based on Olympic point rankings.

Athlete	Event	Round of 32	Round of 16	Quarterfinals	Semifinals	Repechage	Final / BM	
Athlete	Event	Opposition Result	Opposition Result	Opposition Result	Opposition Result	Opposition Result	Opposition Result	Rank
Manita Shrestha Pradhan	Women's –57 kg	Perišić (SRB); L 00–10	Did not advance					

== Shooting ==
Nepali shooters achieved one quota places for Paris 2024 based on the allocations of universality spots.

Athlete	Event	Qualification		Final	
Athlete	Event	Points	Rank	Points	Rank
Sushmita Nepal	Women's 10 m air rifle	607.8	42	Did not advance	

== Swimming ==
Nepal sent two swimmers to compete at the 2024 Paris Olympics.

Athlete	Event	Heat		Semifinal		Final	
Athlete	Event	Time	Rank	Time	Rank	Time	Rank
Alexander Shah	Men's 100 m freestyle	51.91	59	Did not advance			
Duana Lama	Women's 200 m freestyle	2:20.74	30	Did not advance			

== Table tennis ==
For the first time at the Olympics, Nepal entered one table tennis player into Paris 2024. Santoo Shrestha qualified for the games following the triumph of winning the gold medal in the men's single event, at the 2024 South Asian Qualification Tournament in Kathmandu.

Athlete	Event	Preliminary	Round 1	Round 2	Round of 16	Quarterfinals	Semifinals	Final / BM	
Athlete	Event	Opposition Result	Opposition Result	Opposition Result	Opposition Result	Opposition Result	Opposition Result	Opposition Result	Rank
Santoo Shrestha	Men's singles	Diaw (SEN); L 0–4	Did not advance						
