= Nepal at the 1992 Summer Olympics =

- IOC code: NEP
- NOC: Nepal Olympic Committee

in Barcelona
- Competitors: 2 in 2 sports
- Medals: Gold 0 Silver 0 Bronze 0 Total 0

Summer Olympics appearances (overview)
- 1964; 1968; 1972; 1976; 1980; 1984; 1988; 1992; 1996; 2000; 2004; 2008; 2012; 2016; 2020; 2024

Nepal competed at the 1992 Summer Olympics in Barcelona, Spain.

== Competitors ==
The following is the list of number of competitors in the Games.

Sport	Men	Women	Total
Athletics	1	0	1
Shooting	0	1	1
Total	1	1	2

== Results by event ==
=== Athletics ===
Men's Marathon

- Hari Rokaya → 70th place (2:32.26)
