= Nepal Olympic Museum =

Museum in Nepal

- location in Nepal Map, Nepal Olympic Museum, Kathmandu
- Established: 1994; 32 years ago
- Location: (NOC), building ground floor, Lalitpur, Nepal
- Coordinates: 27.705605°N 85.289011°E
- Founder: Late.Chhitij Arun Shrestha
- President: Miss.Sonsy Shrestha
- Area: 12.5 acres (51,000 m^{2}) / 145 galleries

The 'Nepal Olympic Museum' (NOM) is a non-profit cultural and educational institution located in Kathmandu, Nepal. Established in 1994 A.D., it holds the distinction of being the first and only Olympic museum in the South Asian region. The museum is dedicated to the preservation of Nepal's sporting heritage and the promotion of the Olympic Movement and its values: Excellence, Friendship, and Respect. Envisioned by its founder/president Chhitij Arun Shrestha, it has been in existence since 1999 inside the premise of the National Sports Council, during the 8th South Asian Games Kathmandu.

== History ==
The museum was officially registered as Sports Nepal Olympic Museum (NOM) on 23 June 1994 (2051/03/09B.S). The Museum is affiliated to National Sports Council (NSC) & Nepal Olympic Committee (NOC). The name was later changed to Nepal Olympic Museum (NOM). The sole purpose of establishing this museum has been to preserve various Nepalese sports related objects of historical significance and assemble them at one place.

The museum is affiliated with the National Sports Council and the Nepal Olympic Committee. It preserves objects related to the history of sports in Nepal and has participated in activities supporting sports heritage and the Olympic movement.

In early 2026, Sonsy Shrestha was appointed President of the Nepal Olympic Museum at the age of 23. Her appointment made her one of the youngest individuals in Nepal to head a national sports heritage and archiving organization, as well as one of the youngest presidents across Nepal's sports-related governing bodies.

== Collection ==
The NOM houses a vast collection of artifacts that chronicle the history of sports in Nepal and the country's participation in the International Olympic Games. Key highlights include:

Historical Memorabilia: Medals, trophies, and torches from various editions of the Olympic Games and South Asian Games (SAG).

Equipment & Gear: Historic jerseys, shoes, and equipment used by legendary Nepali Olympians.

Archives: A significant collection of rare photographs, newspaper clippings, and official documents dating back to the mid-20th century.

The "First Medal" Flag: The museum holds the historic Nepali flag used during the country's first international medal win.

== Organization ==
The museum is an independent institution affiliated with the National Sports Council (NSC) and the Nepal Olympic Committee (NOC). It is governed by an executive committee that oversees its archival, educational, and promotional wings.

== See also ==
- Nepal Olympic Committee
- National Sports Council (Nepal)
- National Games of Nepal
- Nepal at the Olympics
- Nepal at the Paralympics
- South Asian Games
- Asian Games
- Nepal at the Olympics
- International Olympic Committee
