= Nisha Rawal (taekwondo) =

Nepalese taekwondo athlete and coach (born 1995)

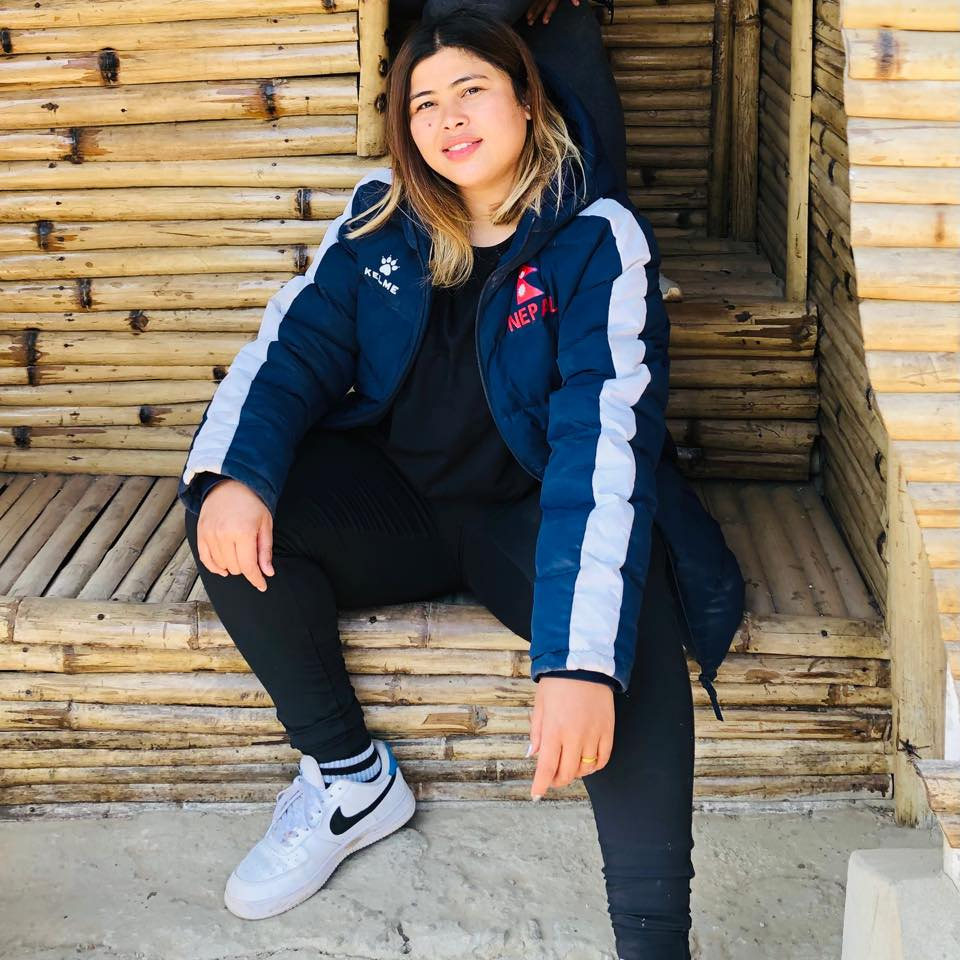
- National Taekwondo Athlete

Personal information
- Full name: Nisha Rawal
- Nationality: Nepalese
- Born: 11 September 1995 (age 31) Lalitpur, Nepal
- Height: 1.72 m (5 ft 7 1/2 in)
- Weight: 73 kg (161 lb)
- Spouse: Ravi Bist

Sport
- Sport: Taekwondo
Medal record
Representing Nepal
2nd Mount Everest International Taekwondo Championship
Gold medal – first place	2014 Nepal	kyorugi
20th Asian Cities Taekwondo Championship
Gold medal – first place	2014 Hongkong	kyorugi
World University Taekwondo Competition & Open Competition Korea
Silver medal – second place	2018 Korea	kyorugi
World University Taekwondo Competition & Open Competition Korea
Silver medal – second place	2018 Korea	Team kyorugi
2019 South Asian Games
Silver medal – second place	2019 Nepal	kyorugi
The Belt & Road China Open International Championship (G1)
Bronze medal – third place	2019 China	kyorugi
National Games
Gold medal – first place	6th National Games 2012	kyorugi
Gold medal – first place	7th National Games 2016	kyorugi
Gold medal – first place	1st Lumbini National Championship 2014	kyorugi
Gold medal – first place	8th Korean Ambassador National 2017	kyorugi
Gold medal – first place	Nepal Sports Council Championship 2017	kyorugi
Gold medal – first place	Everest National Open 2017	kyorugi

Nisha Rawal (born 11 September 1995) is a Nepalese taekwondo practitioner who has qualified to compete at the 2016 Summer Olympics being held in Rio de Janeiro, Brazil.

== Personal life ==
Rawal was born on 11 September 1995 in Nepal. She studies at Tribhuvan University of Nepal in Kathmandu.

== Summer Olympics 2016 ==
In January 2015 Rawal was selected as one of six Nepalese athletes to receive funding of $670 (£440/€560) a month from the Nepal Olympic Committee as part a Rio Olympic Scholarship programme. Nisha was selected for 2016 Rio olympics 2016 . Nisha faced a defeat at the first round of the olympics with the eventual gold medalist shyuin Zheng of China with the score of 2-0 Rawal conceded a late point as she faced a 4–3 defeat at the hands of former world champion and 2008 Beijing Olympics bronze medal winner Epangue at the repechage round

== Taekwondo ==
Rawal played taekwondo for a long time as an athlete in the Nepal Taekwondo Association. She won a gold medal at the 2014 Mt Everest International Open Taekwondo Championships, held in her home country. She defeated India's Priyanka 21–0 in the final of the women's below-76 kg weight division. She was selected to represent Nepal at the 2014 Asian Games, held in Incheon, South Korea. In the women's heavyweight event she was defeated 11–4 in the quarterfinals by Wang Junnan of Macau. After this, Rawal Went on to win Asian cities Taekwondo Championship

She competed at the 2015 Summer Universiade games held in Gwangju, South Korea. In the round of 32 of the women's +73 kg event she was defeated 14–2 by Niu Lulu of China.

In April 2016 she was named taekwondo player of the year by the Nepal National and International Players Association. She traveled to Manila in the Philippines to take part in the 2016 Asian Taekwondo Olympic Qualification Tournament but was beaten 9–0 in her first bout by Kirstie Elaine Alora of the Philippines.

In May 2016 Rawal was one of four athletes offered a wildcard by the Tripartite Commission to compete at the 2016 Summer Olympics due to be held in Rio de Janeiro, Brazil. She will represent Nepal in the women's over 67 kg event.

== Awards ==
- NNIPA Best Taekwondo player of the Year 2017
- Sukriti Padak From Nepal Government
- Spinz Active Girl of the Year

== Post-Retirement ==
Nisha Did her Level II International coaching license on 19 May 2023. After doing her coaching exams she led the Nepal team to Baku 2023 World Taekwondo Championship as a coach. She was also among 4 top coaches to coach at the First Power Taekwondo Championship where her athlete Ashmita khadka won Gold at -53 kg.
