= All Nepal Table Tennis Association =

National governing body for Table Tennis sport in Nepal

- Sport: Table Tennis
- Jurisdiction: (Nepal) National
- Abbreviation: ANTTA
- Founded: 1950; 75 years ago
- Affiliation: International Table Tennis Federation
- Affiliation date: 1950
- Regional affiliation: Asian Table Tennis Union
- President: Chaturanandaj Vaidya
- Secretary: Shankar Gautam
- (Nepal)

The All Nepal Table Tennis Association (ANTTA) is the national governing body to develop and promote the sport of table tennis in Nepal. The ANTTA was established in 1950.

It is registered under National Sports Council (Nepal) and participates in major sporting events through Nepal Olympic Committee.

== See also ==
- Nabita Shrestha
- Santoo Shrestha
