= Ganga Bahadur Thapa =

Nepalese long-distance runner (1935–2011)

Personal information
- Nationality: Nepalese
- Born: Krishna Bahadur Thapa; 1935 Pharping, Bagmati, Nepal
- Died: 25 January 2011 (aged 75–76) Kathmandu, Nepal

Sport
- Sport: Long-distance running
- Event: Marathon

Ganga Bahadur Thapa (1935 – 25 January 2011) was a Nepalese long-distance runner. Thapa enlisted in the army and joined its athletics club. In his international career, he competed for Nepal at the 1964 Summer Olympics in their debut appearance, competing in the men's marathon. He also competed at the 1970 Asian Games.

== Biography ==
Ganga Bahadur Thapa was born in 1935 in Pharping, Bagmati, Nepal. In his later life, Thapa enlisted in the army and joined its athletics club in 1958.

Thapa was selected to compete for Nepal at the 1964 Summer Olympics held in Tokyo, Japan. This was Nepal's first appearance at an Olympic Games, making Thapa one of the first athletes to represent the nation. There, he was entered in one event, the men's marathon. He competed in the event on 21 October against 67 other long-distance runners. There, he failed to finish the race and was thus unranked. Six years later, he was again selected to compete for Nepal, doing so at the 1970 Asian Games held in Bangkok, Thailand.

Upon the recommendation of General Nara Shumsher Jang Bahadur Rana, Thapa and his teammate Bhupendra Silwal retired from the army in 1971 and focused on sports, with Thapa eventually joining the National Sports Council as an official. He retired in 2004. In his later years, Thapa complained of nausea and headaches before being sent to Kathmandu Model Hospital for treatment. Thapa later died on 25 January 2011 at 7 in the morning due to a brain haemorrhage. His body was taken to the headquarters of the Council for a final tribute, wherein his body was draped with the flag of Nepal and the flag of the Nepal Amateur Veterans Athletic Committee.
