= Nepal at the 1976 Summer Olympics =

- IOC code: NEP
- NOC: Nepal Olympic Committee

in Montreal
- Competitors: 1 in 1 sport
- Medals: Gold 0 Silver 0 Bronze 0 Total 0

Summer Olympics appearances (overview)
- 1964; 1968; 1972; 1976; 1980; 1984; 1988; 1992; 1996; 2000; 2004; 2008; 2012; 2016; 2020; 2024

Nepal sent a delegation to compete at the 1976 Summer Olympics in Montreal, Quebec, Canada from 17 July to 1 August 1976. This was the nation's third time competing at a Summer Olympic Games. Nepal's delegation consisted of a single Marathon runner, Baikuntha Manandhar. He finished the race in 50th place.

== Background ==
The Nepal Olympic Committee was recognized by the International Olympic Committee on 31 December 1962. They first participated at the Summer Olympic Games at the 1964 Tokyo Olympics.They missed the following edition, then returned for the 1972 Munich Olympics and have taken part in every Summer Olympiad since. The 1976 Summer Olympics were held in Montreal, Quebec, Canada from 17 July to 1 August 1976; a total of 6,084 athletes representing 92 National Olympic Committees took part. Nepal sent only one athlete to Montreal, Marathon runner Baikuntha Manandhar.

== Athletics ==
Baikuntha Manandhar was 23 years old at the time of the Montreal Olympics, and was making the first of his four consecutive Olympic appearances. On 31 July, he took part in the men's Marathon, and finished the race in 2 hours, 30 minutes and 7 seconds. This put him in 50th place out of 60 competitors who finished the race. The gold medal was won by Waldemar Cierpinski of East Germany in a time of 2 hours, 9 minutes and 55 seconds; the silver medal was won by Frank Shorter of the United States, and the bronze was earned by Karel Lismont of Belgium.

Athletes	Events	Final	
Athletes	Events	Time	Rank
Baikuntha Manandhar	Men's Marathon	2:30:07	50
