= Nepal Fencing Association =

Governing body for fencing in Nepal

- Official Logo of the NFA
- Sport: Fencing
- Jurisdiction: (Nepal) National
- Abbreviation: NFA
- Founded: 2009
- Affiliation: FIE
- Regional affiliation: FCA
- Headquarters: Kathmandu, Nepal
- President: Sunil Kumar Shrestha
- Secretary: Sujan Lal Shrestha

Official website
- nocnepal.org.np/nepal-fencing-association
- (Nepal)

The Nepal Fencing Association (NFA) is the governing body for the sport of Fencing and is recognized by the Nepal Olympic Committee (NOC) as one of its National Sports Association members. It is affiliated to the Asian Fencing Confederation and International Fencing Federation (FIE).

NFA is into different problems so, its popularity and pace slow in Nepal.

== Affiliations ==
The federation is affiliated with:

- International Fencing Federation (FIE)
- Fencing Confederation of Asia
- Nepal Olympic Committee
