= Nepal at the Olympics =

- IOC code: NEP
- NOC: Nepal Olympic Committee
- Website: www.nocnepal.org.np
- Medals: Gold 0 Silver 0 Bronze 0 Total 0

Summer appearances
- 1964; 1968; 1972; 1976; 1980; 1984; 1988; 1992; 1996; 2000; 2004; 2008; 2012; 2016; 2020; 2024; 2028

Winter appearances
- 2002; 2006; 2010; 2014; 2018–2026

Nepal has competed in 15 Summer Olympic Games since its debut in 1964, and in 4 Winter Olympic Games.

Tejbir Bura, a Nepali national, won an Olympic gold medal in alpinism at the 1924 Winter Olympics for his role as a member of the 1922 British Mount Everest expedition. As citizens of other countries took part in the expedition as well, the award went to a mixed team. This event and its honorees do not appear at the online International Olympic Committee website.

Nepal's taekwondo practitioner Bidhan Lama won a bronze medal at the 1988 Summer Olympics in Seoul; however, it is not counted as an official medal since taekwondo was a demonstration sport during the 1988 Summer Olympics.

The Nepal Olympic Committee was formed in 1962 and recognized in 1963.

== Medal tables ==
=== Medals by Summer Games ===
Games	Athletes	Gold	Silver	Bronze	Total	Rank
1964 Tokyo	6	0	0	0	0	–
1968 Mexico City	did not participate					
1972 Munich	2	0	0	0	0	–
1976 Montreal	1	0	0	0	0	–
1980 Moscow	13	0	0	0	0	–
1984 Los Angeles	10	0	0	0	0	–
1988 Seoul	16	0	0	0	0	–
1992 Barcelona	2	0	0	0	0	–
1996 Atlanta	6	0	0	0	0	–
2000 Sydney	5	0	0	0	0	–
2004 Athens	6	0	0	0	0	–
2008 Beijing	8	0	0	0	0	–
2012 London	5	0	0	0	0	–
2016 Rio de Janeiro	7	0	0	0	0	–
2020 Tokyo	5	0	0	0	0	–
2024 Paris	7	0	0	0	0	–
2028 Los Angeles	future event					
2032 Brisbane	future event					
Total		0	0	0	0	–

=== Medals by Winter Games ===
Games	Athletes	Gold	Silver	Bronze	Total	Rank
2002 Salt Lake City	1	0	0	0	0	–
2006 Turin	1	0	0	0	0	–
2010 Vancouver	1	0	0	0	0	–
2014 Sochi	1	0	0	0	0	–
2018 Pyeongchang	did not participate					
2022 Beijing	did not participate					
2026 Milano Cortina	did not participate					
2030 French Alps	future event					
2034 Utah	future event					
Total		0	0	0	0	–

== See also ==
- Sport in Nepal
- List of flag bearers for Nepal at the Olympics
- Nepal at the Paralympics
- Nepal at the Asian Games
- Nepal at the South Asian Games
- List of Olympians from Nepal
- Nepal Olympic Museum
- Nepal Olympic Committee
