= Khadga Bahadur Ranabhat =

Nepali male track and field coach and middle and long-distance runner

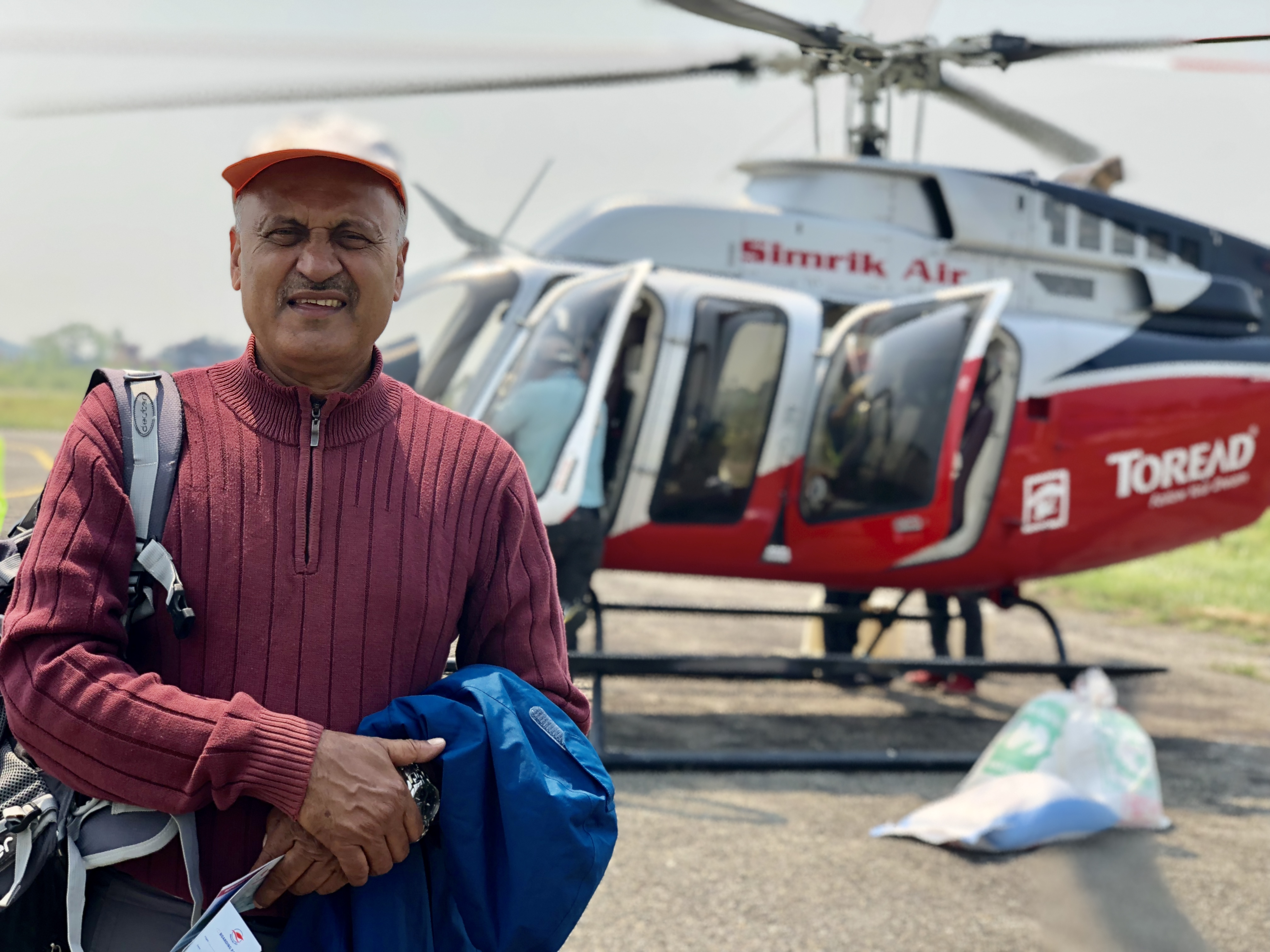
Khadga Bahadur Ranabhat - After successful route defining/measurement for Annapurna Marathon.

Khadga Bahadur Ranabhat (Nepali: खड्ग बहादुर रानाभट) born 14 June 1949 in Bhatkhola, Syangja is a Nepali male track and field coach and middle/long-distance runner.

== Asian Games ==
1. 1970 Asian Games (Athlete, 3000m steeplechase) - 8th place
2. 1982 Asian Games (Track and field coach)
3. 1986 Asian Games (Track and field coach)
4. 2010 Asian Games (Athletics team manager)

== Summer Olympics ==
1. 1984 Summer Olympics (Track and field coach)
2. 1988 Summer Olympics (Track and field coach)

== Marathons ==
1. Tenzing Hillary Everest Marathon (Technical Director)
2. Lumbini Peace Marathon (Technical Director)
3. Annapurna Marathon (Technical Director)
4. Pokhara Marathon (Technical Director)

== Achievements ==
- Flag bearer for Nepal in 1984 Summer Olympics (Los Angeles)
- Vice President, Asian Track and Field Coaches Association
- Lifetime Achievement Award - Nepal Sports Journalists Forum
- Former member of National Sports Council (Nepal)
- Former member of Nepal Olympic Committee
- Founder/Chairmen Ex-Sportsman Forum Nepal
- President Naulo Ghumti Nepal
- Former Vice-Chairman, Bhatkhola VDC, Syangja
