= Chandra Kala Thapa =

Nepalese sprinter

Chandra Kala Thapa (Nepali: चन्द्रकला थापा) (born 2 September 1980 in Urlabari, Morang District) is a track and field sprint athlete who competes internationally for Nepal.

Thapa represented Nepal at the 2008 Summer Olympics in Beijing. She competed at the 100 metres sprint and placed 9th in her heat without advancing to the second round. She ran the distance in a time of 13.15 seconds.
