= Kalpana Pariyar =

Nepalese sports shooter

Personal information
- Nationality: Nepali
- Born: 19 January 1995 (age 31)

Sport
- Country: Nepal
- Sport: Sports shooting

Kalpana Pariyar (born 19 January 1995) is a Nepalese professional Shooter, she represented Nepal in The International Shooting Sport Federation (ISSF) Tournament in the Women's 10 metre air rifle event.

== Career ==
- In 2018, she participated in the 2018 Asian Games and secured 45th place in the Women's 10 metre air rifle event
- In 2019, she won silver medal in the XIII South Asian Games 2019 and participated in the World Cup and Asian Championship.

== Achievements ==
=== 2020 Summer Olympic ===
She qualified for Olympic Games at Tokyo, Japan after wild cards qualifying spots for Asian Shooters by the International Olympic Committee (IOC) Tripartite Commission to represent Nepal in Women's 10 metre air rifle at the Shooting competition of the 2020 Summer Olympics in Tokyo, Japan.

=== Tournaments Record ===
Competitions
Year	Name	Venue	Place
2021	2020 Summer Olympics	Tokyo Japan	46
2019	2019 World Cup	New Delhi India	101
2019	Asian Shooting Championships	Doha Qatar	47
2019	XIII South Asian Games 2019	Kathmandu Nepal	Silver
2018	18th Asian Games 2018	Jakarta Indonesia	45
