= Pramila Rijal =

Nepalese sprinter

Pramila Rijal (Nepali: प्रमिला रिजाल) (born 1 May 1985 in Chisapani) is a Nepalese track and field athlete who represented Nepal at the 2012 Summer Olympics in the women's 100 metres. She also competed at the 2009 Asian Athletics Championships, running in the heats of the 200 metres and 400 metres.
