= Sarswati Chaudhary =

Nepalese sprinter (born 1997)

Personal information
- Born: 12 February 1997 (age 28)

Sport
- Country: Nepal
- Sport: Athletics
- Event: 100 metres

Sarswati Chaudhary (born 12 February 1997) is a Nepalese female track and field athlete who competes in the 100 metres. She was her nation's sole representative at the 2019 World Athletics Championships, where she competed in the heats of the women's 100 m and set a Nepalese record of 12.72 seconds for the event, ranking 46th overall. She did not qualify to compete in the semi-finals.

== International competitions ==
Year	Competition	Venue	Position	Event	Notes
2019	World Championships	Doha, Qatar	46th (p)	100 m	12.72 NR
2021	Olympic Games	Tokyo, Japan	20th (p)	100 m	12.91
