= Bhakta Bahadur Sapkota =

Nepalese long-distance runner

Personal information
- Nationality: Nepalese
- Born: 1947 (age 78–79)

Sport
- Sport: Long-distance running
- Event: Marathon

Bhakta Bahadur Sapkota (born 1947) is a Nepalese long-distance runner. He competed in the marathon at the 1972 Summer Olympics.

Sapkota was a member of the Nepal Army. Sapkota and Jit Bahadur KC were the first ever medalists in Nepalese athletics.

Sapkota finished 60th in the 1972 Olympic marathon.

In 2016, Sapkota was presented with a lifetime achievement award as a marathon runner of the Nepal Army. He was given a 21,100 Rs (US$178.62) prize and letter of appreciation.

In 2022, Sapkota was honored at a reunion hosted by the Nepal Olympians Association in Kathmandu.
