= Karishma Karki =

Nepalese swimmer

Personal information
- Born: July 18, 1993 (age 32) Bansbari, Nepal

Sport
- Sport: Swimming

Karishma Karki (Nepali: करिश्मा कार्की) (born July 18, 1993, in Bansbari, Kathmandu, Nepal) is a Nepali Olympian swimmer.

Karki participated in the 2008 Summer Olympics. She had already created a Nepali national record by winning 12 gold medals at the Fifth National Games. She was awarded the Best Female Player Of The Year by Nepal Sports Journalist Federation in 2009. She also participated in 9th South Asian Games held in Pakistan.

== Family ==
Her father, Ishwor Karki is the head coach for the Nepali swimming team. She has three siblings, Kishor Karki and Kristina Karki, who were national level swimmers, and a younger brother, Kiran Karki, who at the age of 9 was already a participant in this year's games.

== Gold Medals won at Fifth National Games ==
200m breast-stroke
100m butterfly
50m backstroke
100m freestyle
200m freestyle
200m backstroke
50m butterfly
Women's relay
200m individual medley
100m backstroke
100m breaststroke
50m freestyle

== Education ==
Karishma received her undergraduate degree in architecture engineering from Khwopa Engineering College.
