= Shreya Dhital =

Nepalese swimmer

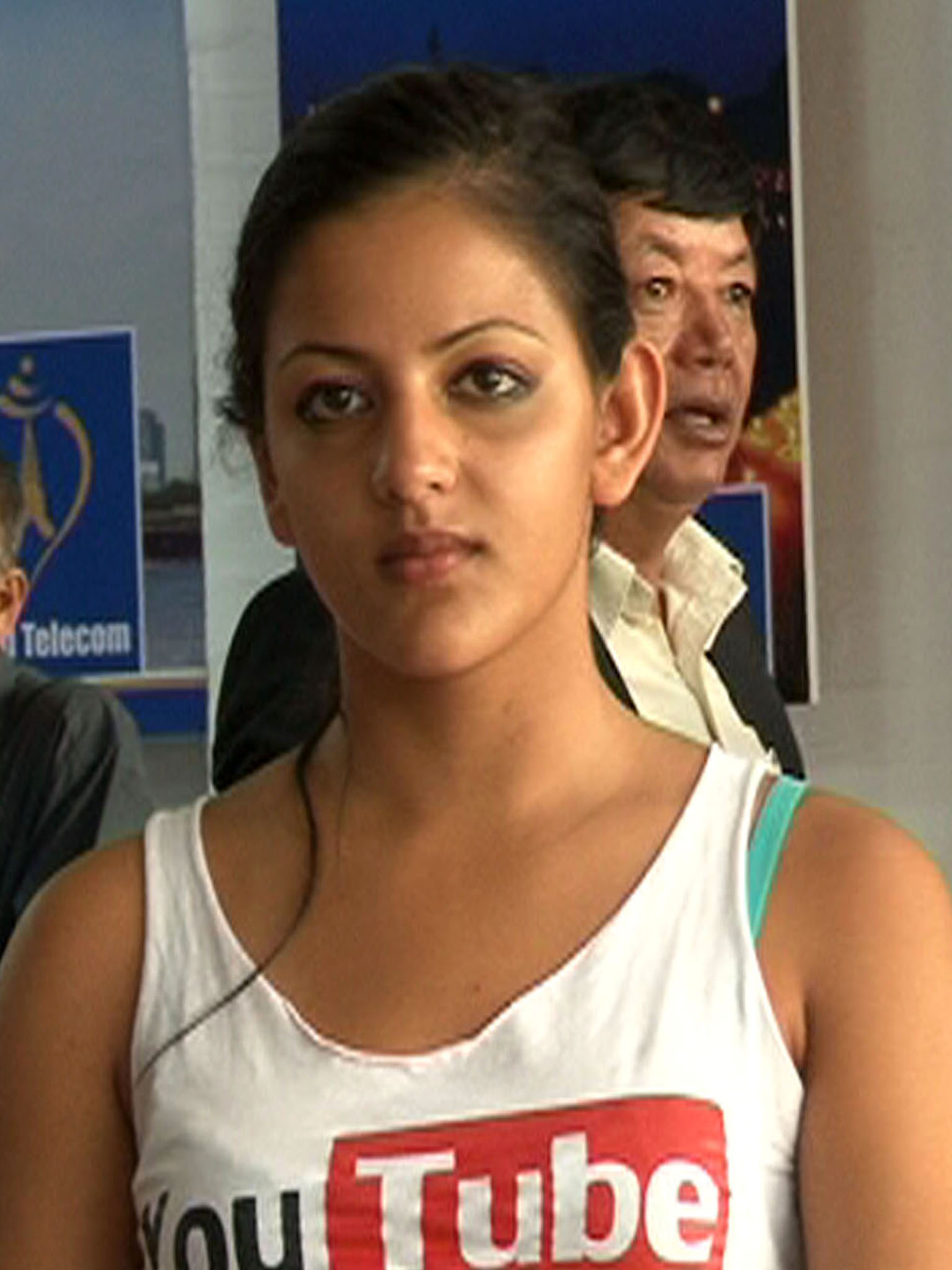

Personal information
- Nationality: Nepalese
- Born: Shreya; 12 April 1995 (age 31) Kathmandu, Nepal
- Height: 1.63 m (5 ft 4 in)
- Weight: 54 kg (119 lb)

Sport
- Country: Nepal
- Sport: Swimming
- Event: Women's 100m Freestyle

Achievements and titles
- Personal best: 1 Min 10.80 Sec (2012)

Shreya Dhital (Nepali: श्रेया धिताल) (born 12 April 1995) is a Nepalese swimmer who represented Nepal at the 2012 Summer Olympics. Shreya Dhital has grabbed 13 medals, including 11 golds in the 11th Galaxy Cup Swimming Championship. In the 200m open girl's medley, Dhital clocked 3.16.35 mins, in 50m freestyle she had 33.28 secs and 41.85 secs in backstroke. She also competed in the 2009 and 2011 World Aquatics Championships.
