= Bhim Bahadur Thapa =

Nepalese boxer

Personal information
- Nationality: Nepalese
- Born: 1944 (age 80–81)

Sport
- Sport: Boxing

Bhim Bahadur Thapa (born 1944) is a Nepalese boxer. He competed in the men's featherweight event at the 1964 Summer Olympics, where he could not proceed beyond the round of 32.
