= Bhupendra Silwal =

Nepalese long-distance runner (1935–2012)

Personal information
- Born: 17 November 1935 Sankhu, Nepal
- Died: 20 September 2012 (aged 76) Chhauni, Nepal

Sport
- Sport: Long-distance running
- Event: Marathon

Bhupendra Bahadur Silwal (17 November 1935 – 20 September 2012) was a Nepali long-distance runner. After enlisting in the Nepali Army, he was selected for the Nepali team at the 1958 Asian Games, where he finished the men's marathon in seventh place. He then represented Nepal at the 1964 Summer Olympics, where he competed in the marathon but did not finish the race.

== Biography ==
Bhupendra Bahadur Bahadur Silwal was born on 17 November 1935 in Sankhu, Nepal. Growing up working as a shepherd, Silwal raced with other boys in his village, placing first in every race. He later enlisted in the Nepali Army and practiced running, eventually competing at the 1958 Asian Games held in Tokyo, Japan, for his first international competition. He represented Nepal in the men's marathon but was forced to compete barefoot alongside his teammate after the leader of the Nepali team, an army general, had ordered them to. Silwal blamed Nepali sports officials for not buying shoes for them in a contemporary interview with BBC Nepali. As he ran the marathon barefoot, pieces of tarmacadam became embedded in his feet, which led to bleeding after he tried to remove the pieces using a needle, resulting in the skin on his soles falling off. He eventually finished seventh in the race.

After the Asian Games, he was selected to compete at the 1964 Summer Olympics in the same city after his speed was noticed during military training. Silwal represented Nepal at the 1964 Summer Olympics, the first that the nation participated in. Running this time in spiked shoes, he did not finish the men's marathon on 21 October.

The 1964 Summer Games was the only one Silwal competed in. He later married and had two sons. In later life, he attended the 2012 Summer Olympics as a spectator. Having suffered from asthma and high blood pressure, he was admitted to the Birendra Hospital for treatment of a stomach tumor a month after the 2012 Games. He died on 20 September from complications from the surgery.
