= Pushpa Raj Ojha =

Nepalese sprinter

Personal information
- Nationality: Nepalese
- Born: 19 August 1959 (age 66)

Sport
- Sport: Sprinting
- Event: 400 metres

Pushpa Raj Ojha (born 19 August 1959) is a Nepalese sprinter. He competed in the men's 400 metres at the 1984 Summer Olympics.
