= Bimala Ranamagar =

Nepalese long-distance runner

Personal information
- Nationality: Nepalese
- Born: Bimala Rana Magar; 2 July 1971 (age 55)

Sport
- Sport: Long-distance running
- Event: Marathon

Bimala Ranamagar (born 2 July 1971) is a Nepalese long-distance runner. She competed in the women's marathon at the 1996 Summer Olympics.
