= Soniya Bhatta =

Nepalese judoka (born 2002)

Personal information
- Nationality: Nepali
- Born: January 4, 2002 (age 24)
- Weight: 48

Sport
- Country: Nepal
- Sport: Judo
- Weight class: 48 kg

Soniya Bhatta (born 4 January 2002) is a Nepali professional judoka, she represents Nepal internationally in Judo Tournament in the Extra-lightweight (48 kg) event.

== Career ==
- in 2018 she participated at the 2018 Summer Youth Olympics (III Summer Youth Olympic Games).
- in 2019 she won a bronze medal in the 2019 South Asian Games.
- Currently she is World No 127 in female -48 kg Division of World Ranking List at World Judo List.

== Achievements ==
=== 2020 Summer Olympics ===
She has qualified after the last qualifying Invitational spots from International Judo Federation (IJF) to represent Nepal in Women's 48 kg (Extra-lightweight) at the Judo competition of the 2020 Summer Olympics in Tokyo, Japan.

== Tournaments record ==
Competitions
Year	Dates	Name	Position
2021	6 April 2021	Asia-Oceania Senior Championships 2021	-
2019	8–10 December 2019	2019 South Asian Games	Bronze
2019	16 October 2019	World Championships Juniors 2019	-
2018	7 October 2018	The 2018 Summer Youth Olympics (III Summer Youth Olympic Games)	-
2018	21 July 2018	Macau Cadets Asian Cup 2018	-
2018	14 July 2018	Hong Kong Cadets Asian Cup 2018	5
2018	10 May 2018	Asian Cadet Championships 2018	5
