= Nepal Skating and Skateboarding Association =

Governing body for Skating in Nepal

- Sport: Roller sports
- Category: SKATES
- Jurisdiction: National
- Abbreviation: NSSA
- Founded: 2015; 11 years ago
- Affiliation: World Skate
- Regional affiliation: Confederation of Asian Roller Sports (CARS)
- President: Achut Khanal
- Secretary: Satya Thapa

Official website
- nepalskating.org.np
- (Nepal)

The Nepal Skating and Skateboarding Association (NSSA) is the national governing body for roller sports, particularly roller skating and skateboarding, in Nepal. NSSA is registered under NSC and registration number is (NSC-150). NSSA regularly organize and sanction different national level competition and tournaments. Through these tournaments NSSA provide platform to players participate in international level. NSSA manages all categories of this sport figure, speed & short track.

== Affiliated Association ==
- Bagmati Province Skating and Skateboarding Association
- Gandaki Province Skating and Skateboarding Association
