= Pushkardhoj Shahi =

Nepalese boxer

Personal information
- Nationality: Nepalese
- Born: 1959

Sport
- Sport: Boxing

Pushkardhoj Shahi (born 1959) is a Nepalese boxer. He competed in the men's bantamweight (54 kg) event at the 1980 Summer Olympics. He won gold medals in 1984 South Asian Games.
