= Tika Shrestha =

Nepalese sports shooter

Personal information
- Full name: Tika Ram Shrestha
- Nationality: Nepali
- Born: 2 September 1964 (age 61) Kathmandu, Nepal
- Height: 1.72 m (5 ft 7 1/2 in)
- Weight: 60 kg (132 lb)

Sport
- Sport: Shooting
- Event: 10 m air rifle (AR60)

Tika Ram Shrestha (born 2 September 1964 in Kathmandu) is a Nepalese sport shooter. He has been selected to compete for Nepal in air rifle shooting at the 2004 Summer Olympics, finishing in the penultimate position out of 47 shooters.

Shrestha qualified as a sole shooter for the Nepalese team in the men's 10 m air rifle at the 2004 Summer Olympics in Athens. He had been granted an Olympic invitation for his country by ISSF and IOC, having registered a minimum qualifying score of 570 at the ISSF World Cup meet in Bangkok, Thailand few months earlier. A less experienced to the international scene, Shrestha showed much of his strength to shoot 579 points out of a possible 600 for the penultimate position in a 47-shooter field, failing to advance further to the final.
