= Bhagawati Khatri =

Nepalese sports shooter

Bhagawati Khatri (born January 26, 1972) is a female Nepalese sport shooter. She placed 43rd in the women's 10 metre air rifle event at the 2000 Summer Olympics.
