= Arjun Kumar Basnet =

Nepalese marathon runner (born 1975)

Personal information
- Nationality: Nepalese
- Born: 5 December 1975 (age 50) Kangel, Nepal
- Height: 172 cm (5 ft 8 in)
- Weight: 58 kg (128 lb)

Sport
- Sport: Athletics
- Event: Marathon
- Club: Tribhuvan Army Club (NEP)

Achievements and titles
- Personal best: Marathon: 2:23:09

Arjun Kumar Basnet (Nepali: अर्जुन कुमार बस्नेत) (born December 5, 1975) is a Nepalese marathon runner. Basnet represented Nepal at the 2008 Summer Olympics in Beijing, where he competed for the men's marathon. He finished the race in forty-fifth place, approximately 26 seconds behind South Africa's Hendrick Ramaala, with his personal best time of 2:23:09.
