= Ram Prasad Gurung =

Nepalese boxer

Personal information
- Nationality: Nepalese
- Born: 14 November 1945 (age 80) Daraun-Sirubari, Nepal

Sport
- Sport: Boxing

Ram Prasad Gurung (born 14 November 1945) is a Nepalese boxer. He competed in the men's lightweight event and was the flag bearer for Nepal at the 1964 Summer Olympics.
