= Amiri Yadav =

Nepalese long-distance runner

Personal information
- Nationality: Nepalese
- Born: 13 July 1959 (age 67)

Sport
- Sport: Long-distance running
- Event: Marathon

Amiri Yadav (born 13 July 1959) is a Nepalese long-distance runner. He competed in the marathon at the 1984 Summer Olympics.
