= Menuka Rawat =

Nepalese long-distance runner

Personal information
- Nationality: Nepalese
- Born: 1972 (age 53–54)

Sport
- Sport: Long-distance running
- Event: Marathon

Menuka Rawat (born 1972) is a Nepalese long-distance runner. She competed in the women's marathon at the 1988 Summer Olympics.
