= Bharat Sawad =

Nepalese weightlifter

Personal information
- Nationality: Nepalese
- Born: 1968

Sport
- Sport: Weightlifting

Bharat Sawad (born 1968, date of death unknown) was a Nepalese weightlifter. He competed in the men's flyweight event at the 1988 Summer Olympics.
