= Bishnu Malakar =

Nepalese boxer

Personal information
- Nationality: Nepalese
- Born: 9 November 1959 (age 65)

Sport
- Sport: Boxing

Bishnu Malakar (born 9 November 1959) is a Nepalese boxer. He competed in the men's light welterweight event at the 1980 Summer Olympics.
