= Jodha Gurung =

Nepalese middle-distance runner

Personal information
- Nationality: Nepalese
- Born: 14 July 1954 (age 72)

Sport
- Sport: Middle-distance running
- Event: 800 metres

Jodha Gurung (born 14 July 1954) is a Nepalese middle-distance runner. He competed in the men's 800 metres at the 1984 Summer Olympics.
