= Mukunda Hari Shrestha =

Nepalese long-distance runner

Personal information
- Nationality: Nepalese
- Born: 14 December 1955 (age 70)

Sport
- Sport: Long-distance running
- Event: Marathon

Mukunda Hari Shrestha (born 14 December 1955) is a Nepalese long-distance runner. He competed in the marathon at the 1980 Summer Olympics.

He also took part in the 7th, 8th and 9th Asian games, however he did not win any medals. In the Bangkok marathon, he finished in third place.
