= Santoshi Shrestha =

Nepali long-distance runner

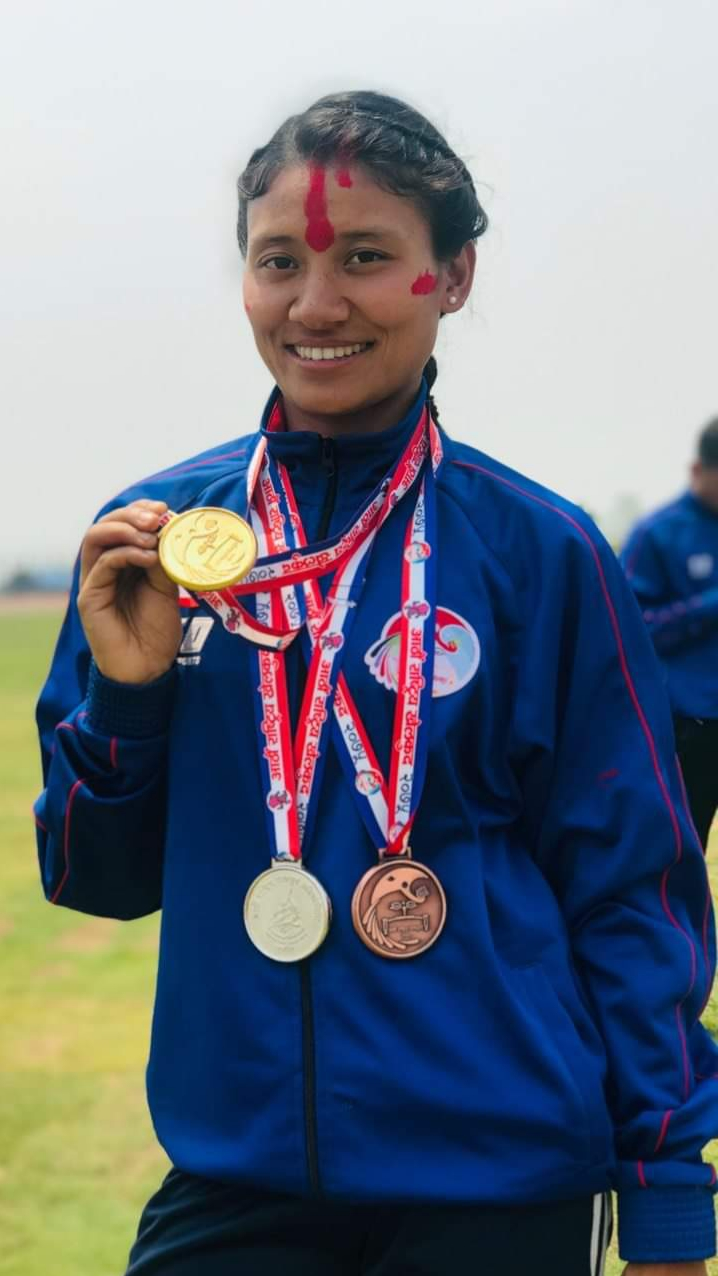

Personal information
- Native name: सन्तोषी श्रेष्ठ
- Born: 1 August 1993 (age 33) Nepal
- Occupation: Athlete

Sport
- Sport: Marathon Runner

Achievements and titles
- National finals: 2023
Medal record
Women's athletics
Representing Nepal
South Asian Games
Gold medal – first place	2019 Kathmandu-Pokhara	10,000 m

Santoshi Shrestha (Nepali: सन्तोषी श्रेष्ठ; born 1 August 1993) is a Nepalese female long-distance runner, who set a new record in Nepali athletics by winning the gold medal in the women's 10,000m race at the 2019 South Asian Games. Until her entry in the South Asian Games, Shrestha competed in middle-distance events.

In 2022, She set a new national record for the half marathon with a time of 1 hour 14 minutes and 14 seconds. The same year she won gold in the 10,000m distance at the Nepal National Games. In 2023 she won a gold medal for 5000m at the Golden Athletics Meet in Nepal. In April 2023 she set a new national record for the 10,000m in Germany, running a time of 34 minutes 31 seconds.

Originally from Jwalamukhi in Dhading, Shrestha has an MA in public administration.
