= Tilak Ram Tharu =

Nepalese sprinter

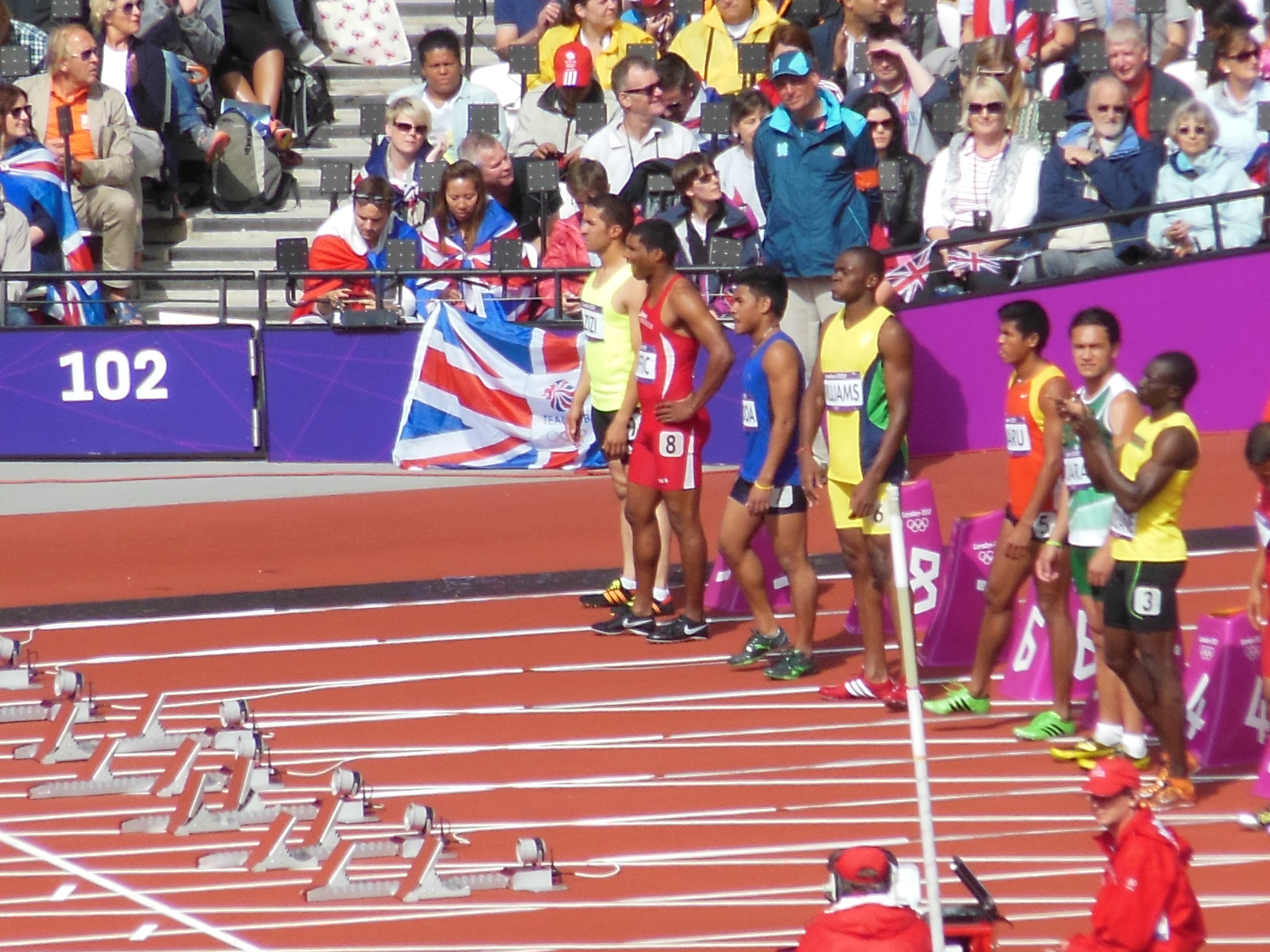
- Before the start of heat 4 of the 100 m at the 2012 Summer Olympics

Personal information
- Born: April 10, 1993 (age 33)
- Height: 1.68 m (5 ft 6 in)
- Weight: 72 kg (159 lb)

Sport
- Country: Nepal
- Sport: Athletics
- Event: 100 metres

Achievements and titles
- Personal best: 10.85 (2012)
- Updated on 15 August 2012

Tilak Ram Tharu (Nepali: तिलकराम थारु; born 10 April 1993, in Narayani Zone) is a Nepalese track and field athlete who represented Nepal at the 2012 Summer Olympics in the men's 100 metres. He was eliminated in the preliminaries but set a personal best time of 10.85 seconds.
