= Tika Bogati =

Nepalese long-distance runner

Personal information
- Nationality: Nepalese
- Born: 26 September 1962 (age 63)

Sport
- Sport: Long-distance running
- Event: Marathon

Tika Bahadur Bogati (born 26 September 1962) is a Nepalese former long-distance runner. He competed in the men's marathon at the 1988 Summer Olympics and the 1996 Summer Olympics. He was also the flag bearer for Nepal at the 1996 Olympics.
