= Dambar Singh Kuwar =

Nepalese track and field athlete

Dambar Singh Kuwar (born 1959) is a Nepalese track and field athlete who represented Nepal at the 1988 Summer Olympics in the men's 110 metres hurdles, 400 metres hurdles and decathlon. He was eliminated in the preliminaries of both hurdling events but set a personal best time of 56.80 seconds in the 400m hurdles. In the decathlon, Kuwar amassed 5339 points to finish 34th and last of the event, 1,578 points behind the penultimate competitor, South Korea's Lee Gwang-Ik.

Affiliated to the Nepalese Army, Kuwar set his lifetime best in the decathlon at a meet in Pokhara, in September 1987, totaling 5355 points. He clocked a hand-timed personal best of 15.6 seconds over 110 metres hurdles in 1990.

During his competitive career, Kuwar was 168 cm tall and weighed 57 kg.
