= Phupu Lhamu Khatri =

Nepalese judoka (born 1996)

Personal information
- Native name: फुपु लामु खत्री
- Nationality: Nepali
- Born: October 5, 1996 (age 30) Lelep, Taplejung
- Height: 1.63 m (5 ft 4 in)
- Weight: 63 kg (139 lb)

Sport
- Country: Nepal
- Sport: Judo
- Weight class: 63 kg
- Updated on 6 August 2016

Phupu Lhamu Khatri (Nepali: फुपु लामु खत्री; born 5 October 1996) is a Nepali female judoka and Olympian. She won a gold medal for Nepal at the 2016 South Asian Games, and went on to bag the Female Player of the Year Award at the NSJF Pulsar Sports Award in the same year.

Khatri has been playing for the senior team since 2012. She claimed a silver medal in Ranking Judo held in Hong Kong in 2015. In the same year, she claimed bronze in the JUA Junior Championship held in Macau. For her gold medal haul in SAG, she eased past her opponents from Sri Lanka, Bangladesh, and Pakistan by ippon before beating an Indian opponent for gold.

Khatri represented Nepal in the Judo at the 2016 Summer Olympics – Women's 63 kg category at the 2016 Summer Olympics. She was defeated by Maricet Espinosa of Cuba in the round of 32. In light of her excellent performance in the South Asian Games, she was also chosen to be the flag bearer for Nepal at the 2016 Summer Olympics Parade of Nations.

== Early life ==
Khatri was born in a remote village of Lelep in Taplejung. Her father, Dorje Khatri, was a trekking entrepreneur who died in 2014 Mount Everest avalanches. As a child, she was drawn to judo and had joined the Multi-Purpose Martial Arts Center in Nayabazar, Kathmandu.
