= Prasiddha Jung Shah =

Nepalese swimmer

Personal information
- Born: 3 June 1989 (age 37) Kathmandu, Nepal

Sport
- Sport: Swimming

Prasiddha Jung Shah (Nepali: प्रसिद्ध जंग शाह) (born 3 June 1989) is a Nepalese swimmer who competed for Nepal in the men's 50 m freestyle at the 2008 and 2012 Summer Olympics. He was the flag-bearer for Nepal at the 2012 Summer Olympics.
