= Hari Bahadur Rokaya =

Nepalese long-distance runner

Personal information
- Nationality: Nepalese
- Born: 2 September 1965 (age 60)

Sport
- Sport: Long-distance running
- Event: Marathon

Hari Bahadur Rokaya (born 2 September 1965) is a Nepalese long-distance runner and coach, renowned for his Guinness World Record and his significant contributions to trail running in Nepal. He competed in the men's marathon at the 1992 Summer Olympics. At 58, he continues to actively train and inspire the upcoming generations of runners, providing them with free coaching.

Rokaya's passion for running started in his youth, running not for competition but for the sheer joy and sense of freedom it brought him. Despite not initially training for marathons, his natural talent and passion led him to compete at both national and international levels.

In 1982, after an arduous journey from Jumla to Kathmandu, Rokaya competed in his first National Level Marathon. Despite challenges, including motion sickness from his first experience with motor vehicles and stiff competition, he secured fourth place. His determination was further fueled by his elder brother, a talented yet troubled runner, leading Rokaya to embrace a more disciplined approach to training and to renounce alcohol.

Rokaya's perseverance paid off with his first national medal in 1984, followed by a string of successes, including his first gold medal in the Rastriya Athlete Marathon in 1989. He soon set his sights on Ultra Marathons, dominating the national scene and qualifying for international competitions. A notable setback occurred when he was unfairly excluded from a World Marathon event in Japan, prompting him to focus on the Everest Marathon.

In 1997, Rokaya won the Everest Marathon, setting a new world record in 1999 and breaking it again in 2000. His training for these races was intense and innovative, adapting to the challenging terrain of the Everest region.

Retiring from international competition at 41, Rokaya turned his focus to coaching in his home village of Jumla. His legacy continues as his protégés lead in the world of marathon running, inspired by his motto: "Nothing beats the sense of freedom while running freely."
