= Kanchhi Maya Koju =

Nepalese middle-distance runner

Personal information
- Nationality: Nepalese
- Born: 3 February 1981 (age 45)

Sport
- Sport: Middle-distance running
- Event: 1500 metres

Kanchhi Maya Koju (born 3 February 1981) is a Nepalese middle-distance runner. She competed in the women's 1500 metres at the 2004 Summer Olympics.
