= Krishna Bahadur Basnet =

Nepalese long-distance runner (born 1959)

Personal information
- Nationality: Nepalese
- Born: 17 February 1959 (age 67)

Sport
- Sport: Long-distance running
- Event: Marathon

Krishna Bahadur Basnet (born 17 February 1959) is a Nepalese long-distance runner. He competed in the men's marathon at the 1988 Summer Olympics.
