= Gyan Bahadur Bohara =

Nepalese athlete

Personal information
- Nationality: Nepalese
- Born: 29 May 1969 (age 57)

Sport
- Sport: Long-distance running
- Event: 5000 metres

Gyan Bahadur Bohara (born 29 May 1969) is a Nepalese long-distance runner. He competed in the men's 5000 metres at the 2000 Summer Olympics.
