= Ganga Bahadur Dangol =

Nepalese judoka

Personal information
- Nationality: Nepalese
- Born: 1962 (age 62–63); Betrawati, Nuwakot, Nepal

Sport
- Sport: Judo

Ganga Bahadur Dangol (born 1962) is a Nepalese judoka. He competed in the men's lightweight event at the 1988 Summer Olympics.
