= Saraswati Bhattarai =

Nepalese middle-distance runner

Personal information
- Born: 8 March 1994 (age 32)
- Height: 1.63 m (5 ft 4 in)
- Weight: 46 kg (101 lb)

Sport
- Country: Nepal
- Sport: Athletics

Saraswati Bhattarai (born 8 March 1994) is a Nepalese middle-distance runner. She competed at the 2016 Summer Olympics in Rio de Janeiro, in the women's 1500 metres. She was the flag bearer for Nepal in the closing ceremony.
