= Raj Kumari Pandey =

Nepalese long-distance runner

Personal information
- Nationality: Nepalese
- Born: 13 December 1969 (age 56)

Sport
- Sport: Long-distance running
- Event: Marathon

Raj Kumari Pandey (born 13 December 1969) is a Nepalese long-distance runner. She competed in the women's marathon at the 1988 Summer Olympics.
