= Raghu Raj Onta =

Nepalese sprinter

Personal information
- Nationality: Nepalese
- Born: 16 August 1952 (age 73)

Sport
- Sport: Sprinting
- Event: 100 metres

Raghu Raj Onta (born 16 August 1952) is a Nepalese sprinter. He competed in the men's 100 metres at the 1980 Summer Olympics.
