= Chitra Bahadur Gurung =

Nepalese swimmer

Personal information
- Full name: Chitra Bahadur Gurung
- National team: Nepal
- Born: 21 May 1970 Kathmandu, Nepal
- Died: 22 November 2010 (aged 40) Falls Church, Virginia, United States
- Height: 1.75 m (5 ft 9 in)
- Weight: 60 kg (132 lb)

Sport
- Sport: Swimming
- Strokes: Freestyle

Chitra Bahadur Gurung (Nepali: चित्रबहादुर गुरुङ) (May 21, 1970 – November 22, 2010) was a Nepalese former swimmer, who specialized in sprint freestyle events. Gurung represented Nepal at the 2000 Summer Olympics, where he became the nation's flag bearer in the opening ceremony. He also held a Nepalese record in the 50 m freestyle.

Gurung competed only in the men's 50 m freestyle at the 2000 Summer Olympics in Sydney. He received a ticket from FINA, under a Universality program, in an entry time of 27.28. He challenged six other swimmers in heat one, including 16-year-olds Wael Ghassan of Qatar and Hassan Mubah of the Maldives. Diving in with a 0.87-second deficit, Gurung scorched the field to register a second-seeded time and a personal best of 27.02. Gurung failed to advance into the semifinals, as he placed sixty-ninth overall out of 80 swimmers in the prelims.

On November 22, 2010, Gurung died in Falls Church, Virginia, as informed by the Nepal National and International Players' Association. The reason of his untimely demise was still under investigation.
