= Devi Maya Paneru =

Nepalese sprinter

Personal information
- Nationality: Nepalese
- Born: 25 July 1978 (age 47)

Sport
- Sport: Sprinting
- Event: 100 metres

Devi Maya Paneru (born 25 July 1978) is a Nepalese sprinter. She competed in the women's 100 metres at the 2000 Summer Olympics.
