= Rajendra Bahadur Bhandari =

Nepalese long-distance runner

Personal information
- Nationality: Nepali
- Born: 14 November 1975 (age 50) Chock chisapani-9 Tanahun, Nepal
- Occupations: Nepalese athlete, Soldier
- Years active: 1995-present
- Employer: Nepal Army
- Spouse: Shanta Bhandari
- Children: 2, (Pramila, Roshan)
- Parents: Dil Bahadur Bhandari (Father); Parbati Bhandari (Mother)

Rajendra Bahadur Bhandari (Nepali: राजेन्द्र बहादुर भण्डारी; born 14 November 1975) is a Nepalese long-distance runner and soldier who has won two silver medals at the 9th Asian Games and two gold medals at the 10th Asian Games.

Rajendra Bhandari was born in Chock Chisapani-9 V.D.C. (22 km from Dumre bazar of Tanahun District) (now Kathmandu, Nepal ) in a Hindu Bhandari Chhetri family. He is one of two siblings with his younger brother Santosh Bhandari. As of 2014, Bhandari lives in Kathmandu. In line with family tradition, he had an arranged marriage with Shanta Thapa in 1996. They have two children: a son Roshan Bhandari and a daughter Pramila Bhandari.

He tested positive for Deca Durabolin – an event which brought wider attention to the usage of anabolic steroids in Nepal. In 2007 Bhandari was found guilty of norandrosterone doping. The sample was delivered on 25 August 2006 in an in-competition test at the 2006 South Asian Games. He received an IAAF suspension from September 2006 to September 2008.

He returned at the 2010 South Asian Games and won the gold medal in the marathon competition. However, the course fell some distance short of the true marathon distance after an organisational mistake.

== See also ==
- Doping cases in athletics
