= Jit Bahadur Khatri Chhetri =

Nepalese long-distance runner

Personal information
- Nationality: Nepalese
- Born: 1947 (age 78–79)

Sport
- Sport: Long-distance running
- Event: Marathon
Medal record
Men's athletics
Representing Nepal
Asian Championships
Bronze medal – third place	1973 Marikina	Marathon
Bronze medal – third place	1975 Seoul	Marathon

Jit Bahadur Khatri Chhetri (born 1947), also known as Jit Bahadur KC, is a Nepalese long-distance runner. He competed in the marathon at the 1972 Summer Olympics, where he did not finish. He is considered the first Nepali athlete to win an international medal in any sport.

Chhetri was the second-ever flag bearer for Nepal at the 1972 Summer Olympics Parade of Nations.

He won bronze medals in the marathon at the 1973 Asian Athletics Championships and 1975 Asian Athletics Championships. Both events also served as the inaugural and 2nd Asian Marathon Championships.

He started his running career after he was recruited to the Nepalese army in Bhaktapur. One of his borrowed shoes fell off during his 1973 Asian Championships marathon run, so he discarded his other shoe and finished the race barefoot, winning the bronze medal despite suffering cuts and blistering on his feet. Then-King Birendra of Nepal approved a house, money, and farmland gift to Chhetri as recognition of his achievement, but as of 2023 he had not yet received the rewards.
