= Baikuntha Manandhar =

Nepalese marathon runner

Personal information
- Nationality: Nepalese
- Born: 24 December 1951 (age 73) Kathmandu, Nepal
- Height: 167 cm (5 ft 6 in)
- Weight: 110 lb (50 kg)

Sport
- Sport: Marathon

Baikuntha Manandhar (Nepali: वैकुण्ठ मानन्धर; born 24 December 1951) is a Nepali marathon runner. He competed in four consecutive Olympic Games, from 1976 to 1988. He has won three consecutive gold medals in South Asian Games making a record. His record was broken by Deepak Bista by securing four gold medals consecutively in Taekwondo.

== Personal life ==
Manandhar was born on 24 December 1951 in Kalimati, Kathmandu. He was married to Subhadra Manadhar. She died in 2021 aged 68. Manadhar has two sons and two daughters.

== Participation ==
=== International events ===
- 1976 Olympic Games - 50th position in man's marathon
- 1980 Olympic Games - 37th position in man's marathon
- 1984 Olympic Games - 46th position in man's marathon
- 1988 Olympic Games - 54th position in man's marathon
- 1993 World Championships - 43rd position in man's marathon

== Awards ==
- Prithvi Award -2072 BS by Department of Sports
- Pulsar Sports Life Time Achievement Award
