= Nepal Olympic Committee =

National Olympic Committee for Nepal

- Country: Nepal
- Code: NEP
- Created: 1962; 64 years ago
- Recognized: 1963; 63 years ago
- Continental Association: OCA
- Headquarters: Satdobato, Lalitpur
- President: Jeevan Ram Shrestha
- Secretary General: Rajiv Shrestha
- Website: www.nocnepal.org.np

The Nepal Olympic Committee (Nepali: नेपाल ओलम्पिक समिति; IOC code: NEP) is responsible for selecting athletes to represent Nepal at the Olympic Games, Asian Games and other international sports competitions, and managing Nepalese teams at these events.

Since the establishment of the National Sports Council (Nepal) in 1959 and the Nepal Olympic Committee in 1962, Nepalese athletes made their Olympic Games debut at the 1964 Summer Olympics and their Paralympic Games debut at the 2004 Summer Paralympics. However, Nepal had not secured an official medal in either event—until taekwondo athlete Palesha Goverdhan made history by winning a bronze medal at the Paris 2024 Paralympic Games. This marked Nepal’s first-ever official medal in the Paralympic Games or Olympic Games, placing the country on the Paralympic medal tally for the very first time. For this historic and remarkable achievement, Palesha Goverdhan was awarded रू65 lakh (US$42,000) by the Nepalese prime minister KP Oli on behalf of the Government of Nepal on 13 September 2024.

== National Sports Associations ==
National Sports Associations are categorized in two categories, i.e., Olympics sports and other recognized sports. The NOC's membership currently includes 27 National Sports Federations.

=== NOC Summer Olympic sports ===
Sport	National Association
Aquatics	Nepal Swimming Association
Archery	Nepal Archery Association
Athletics	Nepal Athletics Association
Badminton	Nepal Badminton Association
Basketball	Nepal Basketball Association
Boxing	Nepal Boxing Federation
Canoeing	Nepal Rafting and Canoeing Association
Cricket	Cricket Association of Nepal
Cycling	Nepal Cycling Association
Equestrian	Nepal Equestrian Association
Fencing	Nepal Fencing Association
Football	All Nepal Football Association
Golf	Nepal Golf Association
Gymnastics	Nepal Gymnastics Association
Handball	Nepal Handball Association
Hockey	Nepal Hockey Association
Judo	Nepal Judo Association
Modern pentathlon	Nepal Modern Pentathlon Association
Rowing	Rowing Association of Nepal
Rugby	Nepal Rugby Association
Shooting	Nepal Shooting Association
Skateboarding	Nepal Skating & Skateboarding Association
Table tennis	All Nepal Table Tennis Association
Taekwondo	Nepal Taekwondo Association
Tennis	Nepal Tennis Association
Triathlon	Nepal Triathlon Association
Volleyball	Nepal Volleyball Association
Weightlifting	Nepal Weightlifting Association
Wrestling	Nepal Wrestling Association

=== NOC Winter Olympic sports ===
These all sports are under the Winter Games Association of Nepal.

Sport	National Federation
Biathlon, Bobsleigh & Skeleton, Luge, curling & Snowboarding	Alpine Sports Federation Nepal
Ice hockey	Nepal Ice Hockey Association
Ice Skating	Nepal Skating & Skateboarding Association
Skiing	Nepal Ski Association

=== NOC recognized sports ===
Sport	National Federation
Air sports	Aviation Sports Association Nepal
Baseball & Softball	Nepal Baseball & Softball Association
Billard	Nepal Billiard, Snooker & Pool Association
Bowling	Nepal Bowling Association
Breakdancing	Nepal Breaking Dance
Bridge	Nepal Bridge Association
Chess	National Chess Federation
Dancesport	Dance Sports Association Nepal
Floorball	Nepal Floorball Federation
Kabaddi	All Nepal Kabaddi Association
Karate	Nepal Karate Federation
Kho Kho	Nepal Kho Kho Association
Korfball	Korfball Federation of Nepal (KFN)
Mountain Sports	Mountain Sports Federation - Nepal
Mountaineering & Sport climbing	Mountaineering & Rock Climbing Sports Association
Muay Thai	Nepal Muay thai Association
Netball	Nepal Netball Association
Paragliding & Hang gliding	Nepal Paragliding Hang gliding Association
Sepak takraw	Nepal Sepak takraw Association
Sport climbing	Nepal Climbing Sport Association
Squash	Nepal Squash Racket Association
Surfing	Nepal National Surfing Association
Tug of War	Nepal National Tug of War Association
Underwater sports	Nepal Underwater Federation (NUF)
Woodball	Nepal Woodball Association
Wushu	Nepal Wushu Federation

=== Others ===
Sport	National Federation
Arm wrestling	Nepal Arms Wrestling Association
Auto Mobile	Nepal Auto Mobile Sports Association
Bodybuilding	Nepal Bodybuilding and Fitness Association
Dandi Biyo	Dandi-Biyo Association of Nepal
Darts	Nepal Darts Association
Esports	Esports Association of Nepal
Futsal	Nepal Futsal Association
Sports & Culture	Nepal Sports & Cultural Association
Elephant Polo	Nepal Elephant Game Association
Kung-Fu	Nepal Kung-Fu Association
MMA	Mixed Martial Arts Association of Nepal
Pankration	Nepal Association of Pankration Athlima
Roll ball	Nepal Roll Ball Association
Sambo	Nepal Shambo Federation
Soft Tennis	Nepal Soft Tennis Association
Stick Sports	Nepal Stick Sports Association
Yoga	Nepal Sports Yoga Association
Zurkhaneh Sports	Nepal Zurkhaneh Sports Association

== Past office bearers ==
=== Presidents ===
S.No.	Name	Tenure
1.	Prince Basundhara of Nepal	1962 – 1967
2.	Kumar Khadga Bikram Shah	1967 – 1977
3.	Sharad Chandra Shah	1977 – 1988
4.	Indu Bahadur Shahi	1989 – 1990
5.	Yudha Bikram Shah	1991 – 1992
6.	Govinda Raj Joshi	1992 – 1993
7.	Keshav Sthapit	1993 – 1995
8.	Govinda Raj Joshi	1995 – 1997
9.	Jeevan Ram Shrestha	1997 – 1997
10.	Govinda Raj Joshi	1997 – 1998
11.	Rukma Shumsher Rana	1998 – 2006
12	Dhruba Bahadur Pradhan	2006 – 2015
13.	Jeevan Ram Shrestha	2015 –

=== Secretaries General ===
S.No.	Name	Tenure
1.	Mohan Raj Joshi	1962 – 1967
2.	Late Anoop Shamsher JBR	1967 – 1984
3.	Kamal Thapa	1984 – 1988
4.	Digamber Suwal	1988 – 1989
5.	Raghu Raj Onta	1989 – 1991
6.	Dinesh Koirala	1991 – 1992
7.	Subarna Bdr. Chhetri	1992 – 1993
8.	Raj Bahadur Singh	1993 – 1995
9.	Shyam Bdr. K.C.	1995 – 1995
10.	Dhruba Bahadur Pradhan	1995 – 2006
11.	Jeevan Ram Shrestha	2006 – 2015
12	Lama Tendi Sherpa	2015 – 2019
13.	Nailendra Raj Shrestha	2019 –

== See also ==
- Nepal at the Olympics
- National Sports Council (Nepal)
- National Games of Nepal
- Sports in Nepal
- Nepal Olympic Museum
- List of flag bearers for Nepal at the Olympics
- List of Olympians from Nepal
