= Snowboarding at the 2026 Winter Olympics – Women's halfpipe =

Women's halfpipe at the XXV Olympic Winter Games
- Snowboarding
- Venue: Livigno Snow Park, Valtellina
- Date: 11, 12 February
- Competitors: 24 from 9 nations
- Winning time: 90.25

Medalists
1st place, gold medalist(s)		Choi Ga-on	South Korea
2nd place, silver medalist(s)		Chloe Kim	United States
3rd place, bronze medalist(s)		Mitsuki Ono	Japan

The women's halfpipe competition in snowboarding at the 2026 Winter Olympics was held on 11 February (qualification) and 12 February (final), at the Livigno Snow Park in Valtellina. Choi Ga-on of South Korea won the event, the first gold medal for her. Chloe Kim of the United States won the silver medal and Mitsuki Ono of Japan won the bronze.

== Background ==
The 2018 and 2022 champion, Chloe Kim, qualified for the Olympics. If she won, she would become the first woman winning three Olympic gold medals in snowboarding. The silver medalist, Queralt Castellet, and the bronze medalist, Sena Tomita, qualified as well. Choi Ga-on was leading the 2025–26 FIS Snowboard World Cup standings in women's halfpipe, having won three of five events. The 2025 World champion was Kim.

== Results ==
=== Qualification ===
Q — Qualified for the Final
DNI — Did not improve

The top 12 athletes in the qualifiers advance to the Final.

Rank	Bib	Order	Name	Country	Run 1	Run 2	Best	Notes
1	14	15	Chloe Kim	United States	90.25	DNI	90.25	Q
2	6	1	Sara Shimizu	Japan	19.75	87.50	87.50	Q
3	7	3	Maddie Mastro	United States	81.00	86.00	86.00	Q
4	3	7	Rise Kudo	Japan	83.50	84.75	84.75	Q
5	4	5	Cai Xuetong	China	77.75	83.00	83.00	Q
6	1	9	Choi Ga-on	South Korea	82.25	DNI	82.25	Q
7	15	18	Queralt Castellet	Spain	78.75	81.00	81.00	Q
8	8	2	Elizabeth Hosking	Canada	61.00	80.25	80.25	Q
9	2	6	Sena Tomita	Japan	50.50	77.50	77.50	Q
10	16	14	Bea Kim	United States	76.75	DNI	76.75	Q
11	5	8	Mitsuki Ono	Japan	68.25	76.00	76.00	Q
12	9	4	Wu Shaotong	China	74.50	75.25	75.25	Q
13	22	24	Leilani Ettel	Germany	54.50	67.50	67.50	
14	17	19	Liu Jiayu	China	62.25	DNI	62.25	Injury 2. run
15	10	10	Madeline Schaffrick	United States	25.75	61.75	61.75	
16	11	11	Isabelle Lötscher	Switzerland	48.50	DNI	48.50	
17	12	13	Felicity Geremia	Canada	44.00	DNI	44.00	
18	21	23	Kona Ettel	Germany	38.25	43.25	43.25	
19	19	20	Yang Lu	China	42.50	DNI	42.50	
20	18	17	Amelie Haskell	Australia	41.75	DNI	41.75	
21	20	12	Anne Hedrich	Germany	14.75	36.25	36.25	
22	23	22	Lee Na-yoon	South Korea	35.00	DNS	35.00	Withdrew due to injury
23	13	16	Brooke D'Hondt	Canada	24.00	DNI	24.00	
24	24	21	Emily Arthur	Australia	5.75	7.25	7.25	

=== Final ===
Rank	Bib	Order	Name	Country	Run 1	Run 2	Run 3	Best	Notes
1st place, gold medalist(s)	1	7	Choi Ga-on	South Korea	10.00	DNI	90.25	90.25	
2nd place, silver medalist(s)	14	12	Chloe Kim	United States	88.00	DNI	DNI	88.00	
3rd place, bronze medalist(s)	5	2	Mitsuki Ono	Japan	85.00	DNI	DNI	85.00	
4	6	11	Sara Shimizu	Japan	10.50	DNI	84.00	84.00	
5	3	9	Rise Kudo	Japan	77.50	81.75	DNI	81.75	
6	4	8	Cai Xuetong	China	73.00	80.75	DNI	80.75	
7	9	1	Wu Shaotong	China	67.75	70.25	78.00	78.00	
8	16	3	Bea Kim	United States	7.25	77.00	DNI	77.00	
9	2	4	Sena Tomita	Japan	23.50	68.25	DNI	68.25	
10	15	6	Queralt Castellet	Spain	4.75	24.00	33.50	33.50	
11	8	5	Elizabeth Hosking	Canada	27.50	DNI	DNI	27.50	
12	7	10	Maddie Mastro	United States	5.50	5.25	DNI	5.50	
