= FIS Freestyle Ski and Snowboarding World Championships 2021 – Women's snowboard halfpipe =

Women's snowboard halfpipe at the FIS Freestyle Ski and Snowboarding World Championships 2021
- Venue: Aspen/Snowmass
- Location: Aspen, United States
- Date: 11 March (qualification); 13 March
- Competitors: 18 from 10 nations
- Winning points: 93.75

Medalists
gold medal	Chloe Kim	United States
silver medal	Maddie Mastro	United States
bronze medal	Queralt Castellet	Spain

The Women's snowboard halfpipe competition at the FIS Freestyle Ski and Snowboarding World Championships 2021 was held on 13 March. A qualification was held on 11 March 2021.

== Qualification ==
The qualification was started on 11 March at 8:45. The eight best snowboarders qualified for the final.

Rank	Bib	Start order	Name	Country	Run 1	Run 2	Best	Notes
1	6	2	Chloe Kim	United States	89.25	93.75	93.75	Q
2	1	8	Queralt Castellet	Spain	86.50	81.25	86.50	Q
3	2	6	Maddie Mastro	United States	80.75	33.50	80.75	Q
4	8	10	Sena Tomita	Japan	70.75	73.00	73.00	Q
5	4	1	Haruna Matsumoto	Japan	31.50	72.00	72.00	Q
6	11	11	Elizabeth Hosking	Canada	71.75	66.75	71.75	Q
7	3	3	Mitsuki Ono	Japan	66.50	61.75	66.50	Q
8	5	9	Kurumi Imai	Japan	54.75	63.00	63.00	Q
9	7	4	Leilani Ettel	Germany	60.00	DNS	60.00	
10	15	13	Emily Arthur	Australia	55.75	26.75	55.75	
11	14	14	Alexandria Simsovits	United States	43.50	46.75	46.75	
12	18	16	Šárka Pančochová	Czech Republic	39.50	39.75	39.75	
13	17	18	Lee Na-yoon	South Korea	22.50	37.00	37.00	
14	16	17	Jenise Spiteri	Malta	32.50	30.50	32.50	
15	9	7	Zoe Kalapos	United States	24.25	15.25	24.25	
16	12	12	Tessa Maud	United States	16.00	12.00	16.00	
17	10	5	Berenice Wicki	Switzerland	9.50	DNS	9.50	
18	15	13	Brooke D'Hondt	Canada	7.00	5.75	7.00	

== Final ==
The final was started on 13 March at 13:00.

Rank	Bib	Start order	Name	Country	Run 1	Run 2	Run 3	Best
1st place, gold medalist(s)	6	8	Chloe Kim	United States	90.00	93.75	50.00	93.75
2nd place, silver medalist(s)	2	6	Maddie Mastro	United States	73.25	70.50	89.00	89.00
3rd place, bronze medalist(s)	1	7	Queralt Castellet	Spain	11.25	27.25	87.50	87.50
4	8	5	Sena Tomita	Japan	84.50	86.50	34.75	86.50
5	4	4	Haruna Matsumoto	Japan	77.25	29.25	14.75	77.25
6	3	2	Mitsuki Ono	Japan	20.50	74.50	33.75	74.50
7	11	3	Elizabeth Hosking	Canada	70.50	60.75	17.75	70.50
8	5	1	Kurumi Imai	Japan	61.50	7.00	64.25	64.25
