= Snowboarding at the 2022 Winter Olympics – Women's halfpipe =

Women's halfpipe at the XXIV Olympic Winter Games
- Snowboarding
- Venue: Genting Snow Park, Zhangjiakou
- Date: 9 February (qualification); 10 February (final)
- Competitors: 22 from 12 nations
- Winning score: 94.00

Medalists
1st place, gold medalist(s)		Chloe Kim	United States
2nd place, silver medalist(s)		Queralt Castellet	Spain
3rd place, bronze medalist(s)		Sena Tomita	Japan

The women's halfpipe competition in snowboarding at the 2022 Winter Olympics was held on 9 February (qualification) and 10 February (final), at the Genting Snow Park in Zhangjiakou. Chloe Kim of the United States won the event, defending her 2018 title. Queralt Castellet of Spain won the silver medal and Sena Tomita of Japan the bronze, their first Olympic medals.

The 2018 silver medalist, Liu Jiayu, qualified at the Olympics, but the bronze medalist, Arielle Gold, did not qualify. At the 2021–22 FIS Snowboard World Cup, only three halfpipe events were held before the Olympics. Cai Xuetong were leading the ranking, followed by Tomita and Mitsuki Ono. Kim was the 2021 world champion, with Maddie Mastro and Castellet being the silver and bronze medalists, respectively. Kim was also the 2021 X-Games winner in super-pipe, ahead of Mastro and Haruna Matsumoto.

== Qualification ==
A total of 25 snowboarders qualified to compete at the games. For an athlete to compete they must have a minimum of 50.00 FIS points in Big Air or Slopestyle on the FIS Points List on January 17, 2022, and a top 30 finish in a World Cup event in Big Air or slopestyle or at the FIS Snowboard World Championships 2021. A country could enter a maximum of four athletes into the event.

== Results ==
=== Qualification ===
Q — Qualified for the Final

The top 12 athletes in the qualifiers advanced to the Final.

Rank	Bib	Order	Name	Country	Run 1	Run 2	Best	Notes
1	2	2	Chloe Kim	United States	87.75	8.75	87.75	Q
2	7	10	Mitsuki Ono	Japan	79.50	83.75	83.75	Q
3	1	4	Cai Xuetong	China	83.25	55.50	83.25	Q
4	4	3	Queralt Castellet	Spain	78.75	49.50	78.75	Q
5	6	16	Sena Tomita	Japan	75.75	52.00	75.75	Q
6	8	9	Ruki Tomita	Japan	74.25	66.25	74.25	Q
7	3	1	Liu Jiayu	China	15.25	72.25	72.25	Q
8	12	6	Berenice Wicki	Switzerland	71.50	40.50	71.50	Q
9	10	20	Elizabeth Hosking	Canada	10.00	70.50	70.50	Q
10	16	17	Brooke D'Hondt	Canada	69.25	70.00	70.00	Q
11	17	11	Leilani Ettel	Germany	68.75	15.75	68.75	Q
12	13	12	Qiu Leng	China	63.50	66.25	66.25	Q
13	5	5	Maddie Mastro	United States	65.75	51.50	65.75	
14	18	19	Emily Arthur	Australia	62.50	19.75	62.50	
15	11	13	Kurumi Imai	Japan	54.75	49.75	54.75	
16	15	18	Tessa Maud	United States	53.50	10.00	53.50	
17	14	21	Zoe Kalapos	United States	20.00	51.75	51.75	
18	20	22	Šárka Pančochová	Czech Republic	41.75	18.75	41.75	
19	22	15	Kamilla Kozuback	Hungary	35.50	15.00	35.50	
20	21	8	Lee Na-yoon	South Korea	31.00	34.50	34.50	
21	19	14	Jenise Spiteri	Malta	7.25	25.25	25.25	
22	9	7	Wu Shaotong	China	10.25	16.75	16.75	

=== Final ===
Rank	Bib	Order	Name	Country	Run 1	Run 2	Run 3	Best	Notes
1st place, gold medalist(s)	2	12	Chloe Kim	United States	94.00	27.00	26.25	94.00	
2nd place, silver medalist(s)	4	9	Queralt Castellet	Spain	69.25	90.25	78.25	90.25	
3rd place, bronze medalist(s)	6	8	Sena Tomita	Japan	86.00	88.25	9.25	88.25	
4	1	10	Cai Xuetong	China	81.25	64.50	75.00	81.25	
5	8	7	Ruki Tomita	Japan	16.50	19.75	80.50	80.50	
6	10	4	Elizabeth Hosking	Canada	73.00	79.25	5.00	79.25	
7	12	5	Berenice Wicki	Switzerland	76.25	74.75	11.25	76.25	
8	3	6	Liu Jiayu	China	11.25	4.75	73.50	73.50	
9	7	11	Mitsuki Ono	Japan	71.50	25.50	29.00	71.50	
10	16	3	Brooke D'Hondt	Canada	66.75	11.00	9.00	66.75	
11	17	2	Leilani Ettel	Germany	55.25	57.50	9.25	57.50	
12	13	1	Qiu Leng	China	53.75	9.50	18.75	53.75	
