= FIS Freestyle Ski and Snowboarding World Championships 2025 – Women's snowboard halfpipe =

Women's snowboard halfpipe at the FIS Freestyle Ski and Snowboarding World Championships 2025
- Location: Corvatsch, Switzerland
- Date: 27 March (qualification); 29 March (final)
- Competitors: 27 from 9 nations
- Winning points: 93.50

Medalists
gold medal	Chloe Kim	United States
silver medal	Sara Shimizu	Japan
bronze medal	Mitsuki Ono	Japan

The Women's snowboard halfpipe competition at the FIS Freestyle Ski and Snowboarding World Championships 2025 was held on 27 and 29 March 2025.

== Qualification ==
The qualification was started on 27 March at 10:00. The twelve best snowboarders qualified for the final.

Rank	Bib	Start order	Name	Country	Run 1	Run 2	Best	Notes
1	1	1	Chloe Kim	United States	91.00	92.25	92.25	Q
2	4	7	Choi Ga-on	South Korea	88.00	90.75	90.75	Q
3	3	2	Sara Shimizu	Japan	84.75	90.00	90.00	Q
4	2	9	Maddie Mastro	United States	82.00	83.75	83.75	Q
5	6	6	Mitsuki Ono	Japan	36.25	78.75	78.75	Q
6	10	5	Wu Shaotong	China	77.75	DNS	77.75	Q
7	12	18	Elizabeth Hosking	Canada	73.75	77.25	77.25	Q
8	5	8	Sena Tomita	Japan	75.75	DNI	75.75	Q
9	7	4	Madeline Schaffrick	United States	74.75	DNI	74.75	Q
10	13	12	Isabelle Lötscher	Switzerland	73.00	74.25	74.25	Q
11	8	10	Rise Kudo	Japan	24.25	72.25	72.25	Q
12	20	13	Brooke D'Hondt	Canada	65.75	68.25	68.25	Q
13	9	3	Sonora Alba	United States	67.50	DNI	67.50	
14	17	14	Yang Lu	China	17.50	60.00	60.00	
15	18	19	Leilani Ettel	Germany	59.00	58.50	59.00	
16	24	21	Kona Ettel	Germany	57.25	58.00	58.00	
17	22	22	Lura Wick	Switzerland	56.25	DNI	56.25	
18	19	15	Anne Hedrich	Germany	50.75	53.50	53.50	
19	21	16	Soha Janett	Switzerland	49.00	46.75	49.00	
20	14	11	Felicity Geremia	Canada	47.50	46.25	47.50	
21	25	26	Lee Na-yoon	South Korea	40.00	38.75	40.00	
22	26	27	Misaki Vaughan	Australia	39.50	39.00	39.50	
23	16	17	Amelie Haskell	Australia	14.75	38.75	38.75	
24	23	25	Ai Yanyi	China	13.00	36.25	36.25	
25	27	23	Lola Cowan	Chile	34.75	DNI	34.75	
26	15	20	Liu Yibo	China	19.25	23.75	23.75	
27	28	24	Emily Arthur	Australia	4.75	DNS	4.75	

== Final ==
The final was started on 29 March at 12:00.

Rank	Bib	Name	Country	Run 1	Run 2	Best
1st place, gold medalist(s)	1	Chloe Kim	United States	93.50	DNI	93.50
2nd place, silver medalist(s)	3	Sara Shimizu	Japan	90.75	DNI	90.75
3rd place, bronze medalist(s)	6	Mitsuki Ono	Japan	84.75	88.50	88.50
4	8	Rise Kudo	Japan	72.25	83.75	83.75
5	5	Sena Tomita	Japan	82.50	79.00	82.50
6	2	Maddie Mastro	United States	70.75	81.00	81.00
7	12	Elizabeth Hosking	Canada	79.50	DNI	79.50
8	10	Wu Shaotong	China	77.00	DNI	77.00
9	20	Brooke Dhondt	Canada	74.75	DNI	74.75
10	13	Isabelle Lötscher	Switzerland	25.00	69.00	69.00
11	7	Madeline Schaffrick	United States	66.00	DNI	66.00
12	4	Choi Ga-on	South Korea	29.75	DNI	29.75
