= FIS Freestyle Ski and Snowboarding World Championships 2017 – Women's snowboard halfpipe =

Snowboarding Championship held in Sierra Nevada, Spain

The women's snowboard halfpipe competition of the FIS Freestyle Ski and Snowboarding World Championships 2017 was held at Sierra Nevada, Spain on March 10 (qualifying) and March 11 (finals). 31 athletes from 14 countries competed.

== Qualification ==
The following are the results of the qualification.

Rank	Bib	Name	Country	Run 1	Run 2	Best	Notes
1	2	Cai Xuetong	China	94.75	47.50	94.75	Q
2	4	Arielle Gold	United States	92.50	87.25	92.50	Q
3	10	Maddie Mastro	United States	87.75	92.00	92.00	Q
4	11	Clemence Grimal	France	91.25	17.50	91.25	Q
5	3	Haruna Matsumoto	Japan	86.25	88.75	88.75	Q
6	7	Hikaru Oe	Japan	83.75	33.00	83.75	Q
7	1	Liu Jiayu	China	16.50	83.00	83.00	
8	17	Sophie Rodriguez	France	79.75	81.75	81.75	
9	5	Mirabelle Thovex	France	78.75	14.75	78.75	
10	18	Holly Crawford	Australia	31.00	78.25	78.25	
11	20	Queralt Castellet	Spain	77.75	59.25	77.75	
12	6	Kurumi Imai	Japan	34.25	73.25	73.25	
13	13	Zoe Kalapos	United States	28.25	71.75	71.75	
14	30	Elizabeth Hosking	Canada	68.25	66.75	68.25	
15	21	Wu Shaotong	China	62.50	39.25	62.50	
16	14	Mercedes Nicoll	Canada	62.25	58.25	62.25	
17	15	Emily Arthur	Australia	61.75	51.75	61.75	
18	9	Verena Rohrer	Switzerland	61.00	14.25	61.00	
19	22	Kwon Sun-oo	South Korea	60.00	41.75	60.00	
20	8	Li Shuang	China	18.00	55.75	55.75	
21	16	Katie Tsuyuki	Canada	23.50	55.50	55.50	
22	25	Calynn Irwin	Canada	50.50	21.25	50.50	
23	19	Lellani Ettel	Germany	40.50	50.25	50.25	
24	27	Noelle Edwards	United States	23.00	48.00	48.00	
25	24	Jenise Spiteri	Malta	42.25	44.75	44.75	
26	23	Jeong Yu-rim	South Korea	42.50	44.00	44.00	
27	26	Kaja Verdnik	Slovenia	38.50	38.50	38.50	
28	28	Eva Kralj	Slovenia	33.25	34.25	34.25	
29	29	Klementyna Kolodziej	Poland	31.75	7.75	31.75	
30	31	Šárka Pančochová	Czech Republic	17.00	21.75	21.75	
31	12	Qiu Leng	China	9.50	14.75	14.75	

== Final ==
The following are the results of the finals.

Rank	Bib	Name	Country	Run 1	Run 2	Run 3	Best
1st place, gold medalist(s)	2	Cai Xuetong	China	90.75	32.00	88.00	90.75
2nd place, silver medalist(s)	3	Haruna Matsumoto	Japan	84.75	80.00	81.00	84.75
3rd place, bronze medalist(s)	11	Clemence Grimal	France	38.50	56.75	79.00	79.00
4	7	Hikaru Oe	Japan	77.00	70.50	32.50	77.00
5	4	Arielle Gold	United States	59.50	74.25	61.00	74.25
6	10	Maddie Mastro	United States	70.00	20.75	49.00	70.00
