= FIS Freestyle Ski and Snowboarding World Championships 2023 – Women's snowboard halfpipe =

Women's snowboard halfpipe at the FIS Freestyle Ski and Snowboarding World Championships 2023
- Location: Bakuriani, Georgia
- Dates: 1 March (qualification); 3 March
- Competitors: 17 from 10 nations
- Winning points: 90.50

Medalists
gold medal	Cai Xuetong	China
silver medal	Elizabeth Hosking	Canada
bronze medal	Mitsuki Ono	Japan

The Women's snowboard halfpipe competition at the FIS Freestyle Ski and Snowboarding World Championships 2023 was held on 1 and 3 March 2023.

== Qualification ==
The qualification was started on 1 March at 09:40. The eight best snowboarders qualified for the final.

Rank	Bib	Start order	Name	Country	Run 1	Run 2	Best	Notes
1	1	5	Mitsuki Ono	Japan	82.00	91.75	91.75	Q
2	3	10	Elizabeth Hosking	Canada	59.75	91.00	91.00	Q
3	2	8	Cai Xuetong	China	88.25	26.50	88.25	Q
4	14	14	Yang Lu	China	78.50	27.50	78.50	Q
5	6	7	Wu Shaotong	China	76.00	77.25	77.25	Q
6	4	2	Ruki Tomita	Japan	69.25	59.00	69.25	Q
7	10	9	Isabelle Lötscher	Switzerland	64.50	23.00	64.50	Q
8	8	4	Berenice Wicki	Switzerland	26.25	64.25	64.25	Q
9	15	16	Emily Arthur	Australia	62.25	18.50	62.25	
10	7	6	Brooke D'Hondt	Canada	61.25	9.75	61.25	
11	9	3	Qiu Leng	China	54.50	51.00	54.50	
12	12	17	Zoe Kalapos	United States	8.50	50.00	50.00	
13	11	13	Kinsley White	United States	47.50	49.50	49.50	
14	13	11	Lee Na-yoon	South Korea	42.50	19.25	42.50	
15	16	12	Šárka Pančochová	Czech Republic	12.25	38.75	38.75	
16	5	1	Queralt Castellet	Spain	33.50	2.50	33.50	
17	17	15	Jenise Spiteri	Malta	26.00	31.75	31.75	

== Final ==
The final was started on 3 March at 10:00.

Rank	Bib	Start order	Name	Country	Run 1	Run 2	Run 3	Best
1st place, gold medalist(s)	2	6	Cai Xuetong	China	90.50	49.75	47.75	90.50
2nd place, silver medalist(s)	3	7	Elizabeth Hosking	Canada	85.50	44.50	39.00	85.50
3rd place, bronze medalist(s)	1	8	Mitsuki Ono	Japan	36.50	83.00	14.75	83.00
4	4	3	Ruki Tomita	Japan	35.75	80.75	6.50	80.75
5	14	5	Yang Lu	China	74.75	12.50	74.00	74.75
6	6	4	Wu Shaotong	China	71.75	56.00	26.00	71.75
7	10	2	Isabelle Lötscher	Switzerland	64.00	60.25	24.00	64.00
8	8	1	Berenice Wicki	Switzerland	20.25	18.25	52.50	52.50
