= FIS Freestyle Ski and Snowboarding World Championships 2019 – Women's snowboard halfpipe =

Women's snowboard halfpipe at the FIS Freestyle Ski and Snowboarding World Championships 2019
- Venue: Park City Mountain Resort
- Location: Utah, United States
- Dates: February 6–8
- Competitors: 19 from 11 nations
- Winning points: 93.50

Medalists
gold medal	Chloe Kim	United States
silver medal	Cai Xuetong	China
bronze medal	Maddie Mastro	United States

The Women's snowboard halfpipe competition at the FIS Freestyle Ski and Snowboarding World Championships 2019 was held on February 6 and 8, 2019.

== Qualification ==
The qualification was started on February 6, at 12:00. The eight best snowboarders qualify for the final.

Rank	Bib	Name	Country	Run 1	Run 2	Best	Notes
1	1	Chloe Kim	United States	85.50	90.50	90.50	Q
2	5	Arielle Gold	United States	86.50	7.50	86.50	Q
3	4	Cai Xuetong	China	79.50	85.75	85.75	Q
4	10	Verena Rohrer	Switzerland	24.50	81.25	81.25	Q
5	2	Maddie Mastro	United States	19.00	77.50	77.50	Q
6	3	Queralt Castellet	Spain	72.75	75.25	75.25	Q
7	6	Kurumi Imai	Japan	73.50	76.50	73.50	Q
8	11	Elizabeth Hosking	Canada	61.25	71.75	71.75	Q
9	15	Mirabelle Thovex	France	67.00	64.25	67.00	
10	12	Qiu Leng	China	63.50	16.00	63.50	
11	9	Tessa Maud	United States	63.00	54.00	63.00	
12	14	Wu Shaotong	China	9.50	59.50	59.50	
13	19	Wang Jingjing	China	55.25	55.50	55.50	
14	8	Oe Hikaru	Japan	51.75	17.75	51.75	
15	18	Šárka Pančochová	Czech Republic	11.00	43.50	43.50	
16	7	Haruna Matsumoto	Japan	40.25	9.25	40.25	
17	20	Lee Na-yoon	South Korea	8.50	23.25	23.25	
18	16	Emily Arthur	Australia	9.25	3.50	9.25	
19	13	Leilani Ettel	Germany	3.50	DNS	3.50	
—	17	Fu Xinya	China	Did not start			

== Final ==
The final was started at 19:00.

Rank	Bib	Name	Country	Run 1	Run 2	Run 3	Best	Notes
1st place, gold medalist(s)	8	Chloe Kim	United States	93.50	37.25	24.75	93.50	
2nd place, silver medalist(s)	6	Cai Xuetong	China	84.00	43.50	52.25	84.00	
3rd place, bronze medalist(s)	4	Maddie Mastro	United States	77.00	25.75	82.00	82.00	
4	3	Queralt Castellet	Spain	35.25	21.50	81.00	81.00	
5	7	Arielle Gold	United States	11.75	78.50	79.00	79.00	
6	5	Verena Rohrer	Switzerland	74.50	75.00	68.75	75.00	
7	2	Kurumi Imai	Japan	71.25	10.50	74.50	74.50	
8	1	Elizabeth Hosking	Canada	60.25	22.75	9.75	60.25	
