= Japan at the 2022 Winter Olympics =

- Flag of Japan
- IOC code: JPN
- NOC: Japanese Olympic Committee
- Website: www.joc.or.jp

in Beijing, China February 4–20, 2022
- Competitors: 124 (49 men and 75 women) in 13 sports
- Flag bearers (opening): Akito Watabe; Arisa Go
- Flag bearer (closing): Arisa Go
- Medals Ranked 12th: Gold 3 Silver 7 Bronze 8 Total 18

Winter Olympics appearances (overview)
- 1928; 1932; 1936; 1948; 1952; 1956; 1960; 1964; 1968; 1972; 1976; 1980; 1984; 1988; 1992; 1994; 1998; 2002; 2006; 2010; 2014; 2018; 2022; 2026

Japan competed at the 2022 Winter Olympics in Beijing, China, from 4 to 20 February 2022.

Akito Watabe and Arisa Go were the country's flagbearers during the opening ceremony. Meanwhile Go was also the flagbearer during the closing ceremony.

== Medalists ==
The following Japanese competitors won medals at the games. In the discipline sections below, the medalists' names are bolded.

| Medal | Name | Sport | Event | Date |
|---|---|---|---|---|
| Gold | Ryōyū Kobayashi | Ski jumping | Men's individual normal hill | 6 February |
| Gold | Ayumu Hirano | Snowboarding | Men's halfpipe | 11 February |
| Gold | Miho Takagi | Speed skating | Women's 1000 metres | 17 February |
| Silver | Miho Takagi | Speed skating | Women's 1500 metres | 7 February |
| Silver | Shoma Uno; Yuma Kagiyama; Wakaba Higuchi; Kaori Sakamoto; Riku Miura; Ryuichi Kihara; Misato Komatsubara; Tim Koleto | Figure skating | Team event | 7 February |
| Silver | Yuma Kagiyama | Figure skating | Men's singles | 10 February |
| Silver | Ryōyū Kobayashi | Ski jumping | Men's individual large hill | 12 February |
| Silver | Miho Takagi | Speed skating | Women's 500 metres | 13 February |
| Silver | Ayano Sato; Miho Takagi; Nana Takagi | Speed skating | Women's team pursuit | 15 February |
| Silver | Satsuki Fujisawa; Chinami Yoshida; Yumi Suzuki; Yurika Yoshida; Kotomi Ishizaki | Curling | Women's tournament | 20 February |
| Bronze | Ikuma Horishima | Freestyle skiing | Men's moguls | 5 February |
| Bronze | Sena Tomita | Snowboarding | Women's halfpipe | 10 February |
| Bronze | Shoma Uno | Figure skating | Men's singles | 10 February |
| Bronze | Wataru Morishige | Speed skating | Men's 500 metres | 12 February |
| Bronze | Kokomo Murase | Snowboarding | Women's big air | 14 February |
| Bronze | Akito Watabe | Nordic combined | Individual large hill/10 km | 15 February |
| Bronze | Akito Watabe; Yoshito Watabe; Hideaki Nagai; Ryota Yamamoto | Nordic combined | Team large hill/4 × 5 km | 17 February |
| Bronze | Kaori Sakamoto | Figure skating | Women's singles | 17 February |

Medals by sport
| **Sport** | 1st place, gold medalist(s) | 2nd place, silver medalist(s) | 3rd place, bronze medalist(s) | Total |
| Speed skating | 1 | 3 | 1 | 5 |
| Ski jumping | 1 | 1 | 0 | 2 |
| Snowboarding | 1 | 0 | 2 | 3 |
| Figure skating | 0 | 2 | 2 | 4 |
| Curling | 0 | 1 | 0 | 1 |
| Nordic combined | 0 | 0 | 2 | 2 |
| Freestyle skiing | 0 | 0 | 1 | 1 |
| Total | 3 | 7 | 8 | 18 |

== Competitors ==
The following is the list of number of competitors participating at the Games per sport/discipline.

| Sport | Men | Women | Total |
|---|---|---|---|
| Alpine skiing | 1 | 2 | 3 |
| Biathlon | 2 | 4 | 6 |
| Cross-country skiing | 4 | 4 | 8 |
| Curling | 0 | 5 | 5 |
| Figure skating | 5 | 5 | 10 |
| Freestyle skiing | 6 | 6 | 12 |
| Ice hockey | 0 | 23 | 23 |
| Luge | 1 | 0 | 1 |
| Nordic combined | 5 | 0 | 5 |
| Short track speed skating | 4 | 3 | 7 |
| Speed skating | 7 | 8 | 15 |
| Ski jumping | 5 | 4 | 9 |
| Snowboarding | 9 | 11 | 20 |
| Total | 49 | 75 | 124 |

== Alpine skiing ==
| Athlete | Event | Run 1 | | Run 2 | | Total | |
| Athlete | Event | Time | Rank | Time | Rank | Time | Rank |
|---|---|---|---|---|---|---|---|
| Yohei Koyama | Men's slalom | DNF | | did not advance | | | |
| Asa Ando | Women's slalom | DNF | | did not advance | | | |
| Asa Ando | Women's giant slalom | 1:01.43 | 29 | 59.56 | 23 | 2:00.99 | 24 |
| Sakurako Mukogawa | Women's slalom | 56.09 | 36 | 56.64 | 37 | 1:52.73 | 35 |
| Sakurako Mukogawa | Women's giant slalom | 1:03.39 | 36 | 1:03.38 | 33 | 2:06.77 | 31 |

== Biathlon ==
| Athlete | Event | Time | Misses | Rank |
|---|---|---|---|---|
| Kosuke Ozaki | Men's sprint | 26:24.1 | 0 (0+0) | 44 |
| Kosuke Ozaki | Men's individual | 58:37.9 | 6 (1+0+4+1) | 82 |
| Kosuke Ozaki | Men's pursuit | 46:56.6 | 4 (0+2+0+2) | 51 |
| Tsukasa Kobonoki | Men's sprint | 26:17.8 | 1 (0+1) | 41 |
| Tsukasa Kobonoki | Men's individual | 54:16.6 | 3 (1+0+1+1) | 44 |
| Tsukasa Kobonoki | Men's pursuit | 46:16.0 | 5 (1+1+2+1) | 46 |
| Asuka Hachisuka | Women's sprint | 26:06.7 | 4 (4+0) | 87 |
| Asuka Hachisuka | Women's individual | 51:58.0 | 4 (0+1+0+3) | 65 |
| Fuyuko Tachizaki | Women's sprint | 23:10.8 | 1 (0+1) | 39 |
| Fuyuko Tachizaki | Women's pursuit | 40:27.8 | 3 (0+1+1+1) | 42 |
| Fuyuko Tachizaki | Women's individual | 48:17.5 | 3 (1+1+0+1) | 27 |
| Sari Furuya | Women's sprint | 23:58.9 | 3 (1+2) | 67 |
| Sari Furuya | Women's individual | 52:45.0 | 7 (2+1+0+4) | 74 |
| Yurie Tanaka | Women's sprint | 24:21.5 | 1 (0+1) | 74 |
| Yurie Tanaka | Women's individual | 52:26.3 | 4 (2+1+0+1) | 71 |
| Asuka Hachisuka; Fuyuko Tachizaki; Sari Furuya; Yurie Tanaka | Women's team relay | LAP | | 17 |

Mixed

| Athlete | Event | Time | Misses | Rank |
|---|---|---|---|---|
| Kosuke Ozaki; Tsukasa Kobonoki; Fuyuko Tachizaki; Sari Furuya | Relay | LAP | 14 (3+11) | 18 |

== Cross-country skiing ==
Japan qualified four male and four female cross-country skiers.

Men

| Athlete | Event | Classical | | Freestyle | | Final | | |
| Athlete | Event | Time | Rank | Time | Rank | Time | Deficit | Rank |
|---|---|---|---|---|---|---|---|---|
| Ryo Hirose | Men's 15 km classical | —N/a | | | | 41:30.5 | +3:35.7 | 43 |
| Hiroyuki Miyazawa | Men's 15 km classical | —N/a | | | | 43:47.5 | +5:52.7 | 67 |
| Naoto Baba | 30 km skiathlon | 43:13.8 | 44 | 40:52.4 | 31 | 1:24:43.9 | +8:34.1 | 35 |
| Ryo Hirose | 30 km skiathlon | 43:04.4 | 43 | 41:41.1 | 40 | 1:25:17.7 | +9:07.9 | 41 |
| Haruki Yamashita | 30 km skiathlon | 45:06.0 | 57 | LAP | | | | 53 |
| Naoto Baba | 50 km freestyle | —N/a | | | | 1:14:52.7 | +3:20.0 | 24 |
| Ryo Hirose; Hiroyuki Miyazawa; Naoto Baba; Haruki Yamashita | 4 × 10 km relay | —N/a | | | | 2:03:01.5 | +8:10.8 | 10 |

Women

| Athlete | Event | Classical | | Freestyle | | Total | | |
| Athlete | Event | Time | Rank | Time | Rank | Time | Deficit | Rank |
|---|---|---|---|---|---|---|---|---|
| Masako Ishida | 10 km classical | —N/a | | | | 30:50.6 | +2:44.3 | 27 |
| Chika Kobayashi | 10 km classical | —N/a | | | | 32:10.0 | +4:03.7 | 54 |
| Masae Tsuchiya | 10 km classical | —N/a | | | | 31:41.5 | +3:35.2 | 46 |
| Masako Ishida | 15 km skiathlon | 24:26.3 | 28 | 23:41.1 | 35 | 48:44.7 | +4:31.0 | 27 |
| Chika Kobayashi | 15 km skiathlon | 25:52.5 | 49 | 24:21.9 | 46 | 50:55.4 | +6:41.7 | 50 |
| Masae Tsuchiya | 15 km skiathlon | 24:39.0 | 33 | 23:56.6 | 37 | 49:13.6 | +4:59.9 | 35 |
| Miki Kodama | 15 km skiathlon | 26:17.4 | 52 | 24:45.0 | 53 | 51:48.3 | +7:34.6 | 52 |
| Masako Ishida | 30 km freestyle | —N/a | | | | 1:32:06.3 | +7:12.3 | 26 |
| Masae Tsuchiya | 30 km freestyle | —N/a | | | | 1:34:47.6 | +9:53.6 | 36 |
| Miki Kodama | 30 km freestyle | —N/a | | | | 1:39:53.8 | +14:59.8 | 50 |
| Chika Kobayashi | 30 km freestyle | —N/a | | | | 1:43:33.1 | +18:39.1 | 55 |
| Masako Ishida; Masae Tsuchiya; Chika Kobayashi; Miki Kodama | 4 × 5 km relay | —N/a | | | | 58:40.6 | +4:59.6 | 11 |

Sprint

| Athlete | Event | Qualification | | Quarterfinal | | Semifinal | | Final | |
| Athlete | Event | Time | Rank | Time | Rank | Time | Rank | Time | Rank |
|---|---|---|---|---|---|---|---|---|---|
| Hiroyuki Miyazawa | Men's | 2:54.64 | 32 | did not advance | | | | | |
| Haruki Yamashita | Men's | 3:02.60 | 57 | did not advance | | | | | |

== Curling ==
Summary

| Team | Event | Group stage | | | | | | | | | | Semifinal | Final | |
| Team | Event | Opposition Score | Opposition Score | Opposition Score | Opposition Score | Opposition Score | Opposition Score | Opposition Score | Opposition Score | Opposition Score | Rank | Opposition Score | Opposition Score | Rank |
|---|---|---|---|---|---|---|---|---|---|---|---|---|---|---|
| Satsuki Fujisawa; Chinami Yoshida; Yumi Suzuki; Yurika Yoshida; Kotomi Ishizaki | Women's tournament | SWE; L 5–8 | CAN; W 8–5 | DEN; W 8–7 | ROC; W 10–5 | CHN; W 10–2 | KOR; L 5–10 | GBR; L 4–10 | USA; W 10–7 | SUI; L 4–8 | 4 Q | SUI; W 8–6 | GBR; L 3–10 | 2nd place, silver medalist(s) |

=== Women's tournament ===
Japan has qualified their women's team (five athletes), by finishing second in the 2021 Olympic Qualification Event. Team Satsuki Fujisawa qualified as Japanese representatives by winning the 2021 Japanese Olympic Curling Trials, defeating Sayaka Yoshimura 3–2 in the best-of-five trial.

Final Round Robin Standings
| Team | Skip | Pld | W | L | W–L | PF | PA | EW | EL | BE | SE | S% | DSC | Qualification |
|---|---|---|---|---|---|---|---|---|---|---|---|---|---|---|
| Switzerland | Silvana Tirinzoni | 9 | 8 | 1 | – | 67 | 46 | 44 | 36 | 4 | 12 | 81.6% | 19.14 | Playoffs |
| Sweden | Anna Hasselborg | 9 | 7 | 2 | – | 64 | 49 | 39 | 35 | 6 | 12 | 82.0% | 25.02 | Playoffs |
| Great Britain | Eve Muirhead | 9 | 5 | 4 | 1–1 | 63 | 47 | 39 | 33 | 4 | 9 | 80.6% | 35.27 | Playoffs |
| Japan | Satsuki Fujisawa | 9 | 5 | 4 | 1–1 | 64 | 62 | 40 | 36 | 2 | 13 | 82.3% | 36.00 | Playoffs |
| Canada | Jennifer Jones | 9 | 5 | 4 | 1–1 | 71 | 59 | 42 | 41 | 1 | 14 | 80.4% | 45.44 | |
| United States | Tabitha Peterson | 9 | 4 | 5 | 2–0 | 60 | 64 | 40 | 39 | 2 | 12 | 79.5% | 33.87 | |
| China | Han Yu | 9 | 4 | 5 | 1–1 | 56 | 67 | 38 | 41 | 3 | 10 | 79.6% | 30.06 | |
| South Korea | Kim Eun-jung | 9 | 4 | 5 | 0–2 | 62 | 66 | 40 | 42 | 3 | 10 | 80.8% | 27.79 | |
| Denmark | Madeleine Dupont | 9 | 2 | 7 | – | 50 | 68 | 33 | 41 | 7 | 0 | 77.2% | 23.36 | |
| ROC | Alina Kovaleva | 9 | 1 | 8 | – | 50 | 79 | 34 | 45 | 2 | 7 | 78.9% | 29.34 | |

Round robin

Japan had a bye in draws 2, 6 and 10.

Draw 1

Thursday, 10 February, 9:05

| Sheet C | 1 | 2 | 3 | 4 | 5 | 6 | 7 | 8 | 9 | 10 | Final |
|---|---|---|---|---|---|---|---|---|---|---|---|
| Sweden (Hasselborg) 🔨 | 0 | 1 | 0 | 0 | 1 | 3 | 0 | 3 | 0 | X | 8 |
| Japan (Fujisawa) | 0 | 0 | 2 | 1 | 0 | 0 | 1 | 0 | 1 | X | 5 |

Draw 3

Friday, 11 February, 14:05

| Sheet B | 1 | 2 | 3 | 4 | 5 | 6 | 7 | 8 | 9 | 10 | Final |
|---|---|---|---|---|---|---|---|---|---|---|---|
| Canada (Jones) 🔨 | 0 | 2 | 0 | 0 | 0 | 2 | 0 | 1 | 0 | X | 5 |
| Japan (Fujisawa) | 1 | 0 | 2 | 1 | 1 | 0 | 2 | 0 | 1 | X | 8 |

Draw 4

Saturday, 12 February, 9:05

| Sheet D | 1 | 2 | 3 | 4 | 5 | 6 | 7 | 8 | 9 | 10 | Final |
|---|---|---|---|---|---|---|---|---|---|---|---|
| Japan (Fujisawa) | 0 | 1 | 0 | 2 | 0 | 1 | 0 | 1 | 0 | 3 | 8 |
| Denmark (Dupont) 🔨 | 0 | 0 | 2 | 0 | 2 | 0 | 2 | 0 | 1 | 0 | 7 |

Draw 5

Saturday, 12 February, 20:05

| Sheet A | 1 | 2 | 3 | 4 | 5 | 6 | 7 | 8 | 9 | 10 | Final |
|---|---|---|---|---|---|---|---|---|---|---|---|
| ROC (Kovaleva) 🔨 | 1 | 0 | 1 | 2 | 0 | 1 | 0 | 0 | 0 | 0 | 5 |
| Japan (Fujisawa) | 0 | 1 | 0 | 0 | 1 | 0 | 3 | 1 | 1 | 3 | 10 |

Draw 7

Monday, 14 February, 9:05

| Sheet B | 1 | 2 | 3 | 4 | 5 | 6 | 7 | 8 | 9 | 10 | Final |
|---|---|---|---|---|---|---|---|---|---|---|---|
| China (Han) | 0 | 1 | 0 | 0 | 0 | 1 | 0 | 0 | X | X | 2 |
| Japan (Fujisawa) 🔨 | 0 | 0 | 3 | 1 | 3 | 0 | 2 | 1 | X | X | 10 |

Draw 8

Monday, 14 February, 20:05

| Sheet C | 1 | 2 | 3 | 4 | 5 | 6 | 7 | 8 | 9 | 10 | Final |
|---|---|---|---|---|---|---|---|---|---|---|---|
| Japan (Fujisawa) 🔨 | 0 | 2 | 0 | 0 | 2 | 0 | 0 | 1 | 0 | X | 5 |
| South Korea (Kim) | 1 | 0 | 3 | 1 | 0 | 2 | 1 | 0 | 2 | X | 10 |

Draw 9

Tuesday, 15 February, 14:05

| Sheet D | 1 | 2 | 3 | 4 | 5 | 6 | 7 | 8 | 9 | 10 | Final |
|---|---|---|---|---|---|---|---|---|---|---|---|
| Great Britain (Muirhead) 🔨 | 3 | 0 | 3 | 0 | 1 | 0 | 1 | 2 | X | X | 10 |
| Japan (Fujisawa) | 0 | 1 | 0 | 2 | 0 | 1 | 0 | 0 | X | X | 4 |

Draw 11

Wednesday, 16 February, 20:05

| Sheet B | 1 | 2 | 3 | 4 | 5 | 6 | 7 | 8 | 9 | 10 | Final |
|---|---|---|---|---|---|---|---|---|---|---|---|
| Japan (Fujisawa) 🔨 | 1 | 3 | 0 | 2 | 0 | 1 | 0 | 2 | 1 | X | 10 |
| United States (Peterson) | 0 | 0 | 2 | 0 | 1 | 0 | 4 | 0 | 0 | X | 7 |

Draw 12

Thursday, 17 February, 14:05

| Sheet A | 1 | 2 | 3 | 4 | 5 | 6 | 7 | 8 | 9 | 10 | Final |
|---|---|---|---|---|---|---|---|---|---|---|---|
| Japan (Fujisawa) | 0 | 2 | 0 | 0 | 0 | 0 | 2 | 0 | 0 | X | 4 |
| Switzerland (Tirinzoni) 🔨 | 1 | 0 | 1 | 1 | 2 | 0 | 0 | 0 | 3 | X | 8 |

Semifinal

Friday, 18 February, 20:05

| Sheet C | 1 | 2 | 3 | 4 | 5 | 6 | 7 | 8 | 9 | 10 | Final |
|---|---|---|---|---|---|---|---|---|---|---|---|
| Switzerland (Tirinzoni) 🔨 | 0 | 1 | 0 | 1 | 0 | 0 | 3 | 0 | 1 | 0 | 6 |
| Japan (Fujisawa) | 0 | 0 | 1 | 0 | 4 | 1 | 0 | 1 | 0 | 1 | 8 |

Gold medal game

Sunday, 20 February, 9:05

| Sheet B | 1 | 2 | 3 | 4 | 5 | 6 | 7 | 8 | 9 | 10 | Final |
|---|---|---|---|---|---|---|---|---|---|---|---|
| Japan (Fujisawa) | 0 | 1 | 0 | 0 | 0 | 1 | 0 | 1 | 0 | X | 3 |
| Great Britain (Muirhead) 🔨 | 2 | 0 | 0 | 1 | 1 | 0 | 4 | 0 | 2 | X | 10 |

== Figure skating ==
In the 2021 World Figure Skating Championships in Stockholm, Sweden, Japan secured three quotas in both the men's and ladies singles competitions, and one each in the pairs and ice dance competitions.

Japan initially won bronze medals in the team event. However, they were not awarded at the Olympics due to a pending investigation into a Russian doping scandal. The investigation concluded in early 2024 and the Court of Arbitration for Sport (CAS) disqualified the Russian athlete and the Japanese skater was moved to second place.

| Athlete | Event | SP / SD | | FS / FD | | Total | |
| Athlete | Event | Points | Rank | Points | Rank | Points | Rank |
|---|---|---|---|---|---|---|---|
| Yuzuru Hanyu | Men's singles | 95.15 | 8 Q | 188.06 | 3 | 283.21 | 4 |
| Shoma Uno | Men's singles | 105.90 | 3 Q | 187.10 | 5 | 293.00 | 3rd place, bronze medalist(s) |
| Yuma Kagiyama | Men's singles | 108.12 | 2 Q | 201.93 | 2 | 310.05 | 2nd place, silver medalist(s) |
| Kaori Sakamoto | Ladies' singles | 79.84 | 3 Q | 153.29 | 3 | 233.13 | 3rd place, bronze medalist(s) |
| Wakaba Higuchi | Ladies' singles | 73.51 | 4 Q | 140.93 | 5 | 214.44 | 4 |
| Mana Kawabe | Ladies' singles | 62.69 | 14 Q | 104.04 | 22 | 166.73 | 22 |
| Riku Miura / Ryuichi Kihara | Pairs | 70.85 | 8 Q | 141.04 | 5 | 211.89 | 7 |
| Misato Komatsubara / Tim Koleto | Ice dance | 65.41 | 22 | did not advance | | | |

Team trophy

| Athlete | Event | Short program/Short dance | | | | | | Free skate/Free dance | | | | | |
| Athlete | Event | Men's | Ladies' | Pairs | Ice dance | Total | | Men's | Ladies' | Pairs | Ice dance | Total | |
| Athlete | Event | Points Team points | Points Team points | Points Team points | Points Team points | Points | Rank | Points Team points | Points Team points | Points Team points | Points Team points | Points | Rank |
|---|---|---|---|---|---|---|---|---|---|---|---|---|---|
| Shoma Uno (M) (SP); Yuma Kagiyama (M) (FS); Wakaba Higuchi (L) (SP); Kaori Sakamoto (L) (FS); Riku Miura / Ryuichi Kihara (P); Misato Komatsubara / Tim Koleto (ID) | Team event | 105.46; 9 | 74.73; 9 | 74.45; 7 | 66.54; 4 | 29 | 3 Q | 208.94; 10 | 148.66; 9 | 139.60; 9 | 98.66; 6 | 63 | 2nd place, silver medalist(s) |

== Freestyle skiing ==
Freeskiing
Women

Kokone Kondo withdrew from the slopestyle event after sustaining an injury during practice.

| Athlete | Event | Qualification | | | | | Final | | | | |
| Athlete | Event | Run 1 | Run 2 | Run 3 | Best | Rank | Run 1 | Run 2 | Run 3 | Best | Rank |
|---|---|---|---|---|---|---|---|---|---|---|---|
| Kokone Kondo | Slopestyle | DNS | | | | | did not advance | | | | |
| Saori Suzuki | Halfpipe | 68.75 | 66.25 | —N/a | 68.75 | 15 | did not advance | | | | |

Moguls
Men

| Athlete | Event | Qualification | | | | | | | | Final | | | | | | | | | | | |
| Athlete | Event | Run 1 | | | | Run 2 | | | | Run 1 | | | | Run 2 | | | | Run 3 | | | |
| Athlete | Event | Time | Points | Total | Rank | Time | Points | Total | Rank | Time | Points | Total | Rank | Time | Points | Total | Rank | Time | Points | Total | Rank |
|---|---|---|---|---|---|---|---|---|---|---|---|---|---|---|---|---|---|---|---|---|---|
| Daichi Hara | Moguls | 25.23 | 61.38 | 76.11 | 8 Q | Bye | | | | 24.27 | 62.59 | 78.59 | 3 Q | 24.40 | 61.00 | 76.82 | 7 | did not advance | | | 7 |
| Ikuma Horishima | Moguls | 25.38 | 59.87 | 74.40 | 16 | 25.75 | 61.64 | 76.19 | 5 Q | 25.20 | 63.14 | 77.91 | 5 Q | 25.47 | 65.17 | 79.58 | 3 Q | 23.86 | 64.94 | 81.48 | 3rd place, bronze medalist(s) |
| So Matsuda | Moguls | 25.71 | 59.25 | 73.35 | 18 | 26.11 | 55.47 | 73.35 | 13 | did not advance | | | | | | | | | | | 23 |
| Kosuke Sugimoto | Moguls | 25.00 | 61.78 | 76.26 | 6 Q | Bye | | | | 24.41 | 63.20 | 79.01 | 2 Q | 25.13 | 60.87 | 75.73 | 9 | did not advance | | | 9 |

Women

| Athlete | Event | Qualification | | | | | | | | Final | | | | | | | | | | | |
| Athlete | Event | Run 1 | | | | Run 2 | | | | Run 1 | | | | Run 2 | | | | Run 3 | | | |
| Athlete | Event | Time | Points | Total | Rank | Time | Points | Total | Rank | Time | Points | Total | Rank | Time | Points | Total | Rank | Time | Points | Total | Rank |
|---|---|---|---|---|---|---|---|---|---|---|---|---|---|---|---|---|---|---|---|---|---|
| Junko Hoshino | Moguls | 28.53 | 59.53 | 75.38 | 6 Q | Bye | | | | 28.73 | 57.57 | 73.19 | 13 | did not advance | | | | | | | 13 |
| Anri Kawamura | Moguls | 28.33 | 60.29 | 76.36 | 5 Q | Bye | | | | 27.90 | 64.16 | 80.72 | 2 Q | 28.37 | 62.81 | 78.84 | 3 Q | 28.00 | 60.67 | 77.12 | 5 |
| Kisara Sumiyoshi | Moguls | 30.25 | 54.23 | 68.14 | 15 | 28.50 | 56.70 | 72.58 | 2 Q | 28.71 | 55.87 | 71.52 | 15 | did not advance | | | | | | | 15 |
| Hinako Tomitaka | Moguls | 30.01 | 50.90 | 65.08 | 18 | 29.57 | 57.25 | 71.93 | 4 Q | 29.87 | 55.65 | 69.99 | 19 | did not advance | | | | | | | 19 |

Ski cross

| Athlete | Event | Seeding | | 1/8 final | Quarterfinal | Semifinal | Final | |
| Athlete | Event | Time | Rank | Position | Position | Position | Position | Rank |
|---|---|---|---|---|---|---|---|---|
| Satoshi Furuno | Men's ski cross | 1:13.46 | 22 | 4 | did not advance | | | 26 |
| Ryo Sugai | Men's ski cross | 1:12.29 | 3 | 3 | did not advance | | | 17 |

== Ice hockey ==
Summary

Key:

- OT – Overtime
- GWS – Match decided by penalty-shootout

| Team | Event | Group stage | | | | | Qualification playoff | Quarterfinal | Semifinal | Final / BM | |
| Team | Event | Opposition Score | Opposition Score | Opposition Score | Opposition Score | Rank | Opposition Score | Opposition Score | Opposition Score | Opposition Score | Rank |
|---|---|---|---|---|---|---|---|---|---|---|---|
| Japan women's | Women's tournament | Sweden; W 3–1 | Denmark; W 6–2 | China; L 1–2 GWS | Czech Republic; W 3–2 GWS | 1 Q | —N/a | Finland; L 1–7 | did not advance | | 6 |

Japan has qualified 23 female competitors to the ice hockey tournament.

=== Women's tournament ===
Japan women's national ice hockey team qualified by being 6th in the 2020 IIHF World Rankings.

Team roster

The roster was announced on 8 January 2022.

Head Coach: Yuji Iizuka

| No. | Pos. | Name | Height | Weight | Birthdate | Team |
|---|---|---|---|---|---|---|
| 1 | G | Nana Fujimoto | 1.63 m (5 ft 4 in) | 55 kg (121 lb) | 3 March 1989 (aged 32) | (Sweden) Färjestad BK |
| 2 | D | Shiori Koike | 1.59 m (5 ft 3 in) | 53 kg (117 lb) | 21 March 1993 (aged 28) | (Japan) DK Peregrine |
| 3 | D | Aoi Shiga | 1.65 m (5 ft 5 in) | 60 kg (130 lb) | 4 July 1999 (aged 22) | (Japan) Toyota Cygnus |
| 4 | D | Ayaka Toko | 1.61 m (5 ft 3 in) | 58 kg (128 lb) | 22 August 1994 (aged 27) | (Japan) Seibu Princess Rabbits |
| 6 | D | Sena Suzuki | 1.67 m (5 ft 6 in) | 56 kg (123 lb) | 4 August 1991 (aged 30) | (Japan) Seibu Princess Rabbits |
| 7 | D | Yukiko Kawashima | 1.63 m (5 ft 4 in) | 63 kg (139 lb) | 16 November 1996 (aged 25) | (Japan) DK Peregrine |
| 8 | D | Akane Hosoyamada | 1.63 m (5 ft 4 in) | 59 kg (130 lb) | 9 March 1992 (aged 29) | (Japan) DK Peregrine |
| 10 | F | Haruna Yoneyama | 1.60 m (5 ft 3 in) | 53 kg (117 lb) | 7 November 1991 (aged 30) | (Japan) DK Peregrine |
| 11 | F | Mei Miura | 1.62 m (5 ft 4 in) | 63 kg (139 lb) | 16 November 1998 (aged 23) | (Japan) Toyota Cygnus |
| 12 | F | Chiho Osawa – C | 1.62 m (5 ft 4 in) | 63 kg (139 lb) | 10 February 1992 (aged 29) | (Sweden) Luleå HF |
| 14 | F | Haruka Toko | 1.67 m (5 ft 6 in) | 64 kg (141 lb) | 16 March 1997 (aged 24) | (Japan) Seibu Princess Rabbits |
| 15 | F | Rui Ukita | 1.69 m (5 ft 7 in) | 69 kg (152 lb) | 6 June 1996 (aged 25) | (Japan) Daishin |
| 16 | F | Akane Shiga | 1.65 m (5 ft 5 in) | 61 kg (134 lb) | 3 March 2001 (aged 20) | (Japan) Toyota Cygnus |
| 18 | F | Suzuka Taka | 1.61 m (5 ft 3 in) | 53 kg (117 lb) | 16 October 1996 (aged 25) | (Japan) DK Peregrine |
| 19 | F | Chika Otaki | 1.60 m (5 ft 3 in) | 53 kg (117 lb) | 14 December 1998 (aged 23) | (Japan) DK Peregrine |
| 20 | G | Miyuu Masuhara | 1.57 m (5 ft 2 in) | 43 kg (95 lb) | 4 October 2001 (aged 20) | (Japan) DK Peregrine |
| 21 | F | Hanae Kubo | 1.68 m (5 ft 6 in) | 64 kg (141 lb) | 10 December 1982 (aged 39) | (Japan) Seibu Princess Rabbits |
| 22 | F | Miho Shishiuchi | 1.65 m (5 ft 5 in) | 60 kg (130 lb) | 21 August 1992 (aged 29) | (Japan) Toyota Cygnus |
| 23 | F | Hikaru Yamashita | 1.57 m (5 ft 2 in) | 54 kg (119 lb) | 23 September 2000 (aged 21) | (Japan) Seibu Princess Rabbits |
| 27 | F | Remi Koyama | 1.46 m (4 ft 9 in) | 52 kg (115 lb) | 17 July 2000 (aged 21) | (Japan) Seibu Princess Rabbits |
| 28 | D | Shiori Yamashita | 1.58 m (5 ft 2 in) | 50 kg (110 lb) | 28 April 2002 (aged 19) | (Japan) Seibu Princess Rabbits |
| 30 | G | Akane Konishi | 1.66 m (5 ft 5 in) | 70 kg (150 lb) | 14 August 1995 (aged 26) | (Japan) Seibu Princess Rabbits |

Group play

| Pos | Team | Pld | W | OTW | OTL | L | GF | GA | GD | Pts | Qualification |
|---|---|---|---|---|---|---|---|---|---|---|---|
| 1 | Japan | 4 | 2 | 1 | 1 | 0 | 13 | 7 | +6 | 9 | Quarterfinals |
| 2 | Czech Republic | 4 | 2 | 0 | 1 | 1 | 10 | 8 | +2 | 7 | Quarterfinals |
| 3 | Sweden | 4 | 2 | 0 | 0 | 2 | 7 | 8 | −1 | 6 | Quarterfinals |
| 4 | China (H) | 4 | 1 | 1 | 0 | 2 | 7 | 7 | 0 | 5 | Eliminated |
| 5 | Denmark | 4 | 1 | 0 | 0 | 3 | 7 | 14 | −7 | 3 | Eliminated |

Source: IIHF
Rules for classification: Tiebreakers
(H) Host

| 3 February 2022; 16:40 v | Sweden | 1–3 (0–1, 1–0, 0–2) | Japan | Wukesong Arena, Beijing; Attendance: 482 |

Game reference

Emma Söderberg
Goalies
Nana Fujimoto
Referees:
(Canada) Cianna Lieffers
(Canada) Elizabeth Mantha
Linesmen:
(United States) Kendall Hanley
(Russia) Diana Mokhova

| | 0–1 | 19:13 – Koike (Kubo, Osawa) |
| Nylén Persson (Wikner-Zienkiewicz) – 20:30 | 1–1 |
| | 1–2 | 44:03 – Ukita (Ak. Shiga, Ao. Shiga) |
| | 1–3 | 58:59 – Yoneyama (Koyama, Hosoyamada) (ENG) |

6 min
Penalties
4 min
27
Shots
40

| 5 February 2022; 16:40 v | Japan | 6–2 (3–0, 2–1, 1–1) | Denmark | Wukesong Arena, Beijing; Attendance: 476 |

Game reference

Nana Fujimoto
Akane Konishi
Goalies
Cassandra Repstock-Romme
Lisa Jensen
Referees:
(United States) Kelly Cooke
(Sweden) Maria Furberg
Linesmen:
(Canada) Alex Clarke
(United States) Sara Strong

| H. Yamashita (Miura, Koike) – 10:46 | 1–0 |
| H. Toko (Ao. Shiga, A. Toko) – 12:08 | 2–0 |
| Ukita – 13:50 | 3–0 |
| A. Toko (H. Toko) – 22:53 | 4–0 |
| | 4–1 | 29:16 – Bau Hansen (N. Jensen) |
| Ak. Shiga (Kubo, H. Toko) (PP) – 39:54 | 5–1 |
| H. Yoneyama (H. Yamashita, Koike) – 48:02 | 6–1 |
| | 6–2 | 59:55 – Jakobsen (Persson, Weis) (PP) |

8 min
Penalties
8 min
42
Shots
20

| 6 February 2022; 16:40 v | China | 2–1 GWS (0–1, 0–0, 1–0) (OT: 0–0) (SO: 1–0) | Japan | Wukesong Arena, Beijing; Attendance: 506 |

Game reference
| Kimberly Newell | Goalies | Nana Fujimoto | Referees: (Germany) Tijana Haack (Finland) Anniina Nurmi; Linesmen: (Finland) Jenni Heikkinen (Austria) Julia Kainberger |
| / 0–1 / 18:02 – Hosoyamada (Koike, Osawa) (PP); Woo (Kolstad) – 41:06 / 1–1 | | | Referees: (Germany) Tijana Haack (Finland) Anniina Nurmi; Linesmen: (Finland) Jenni Heikkinen (Austria) Julia Kainberger |
| Lum (miss); Llanes (miss); Segedi (miss); Miller | Shootout | (miss) Kubo; (miss) Shiga; (miss) Ukita; (miss) H. Toko; (miss) A. Toko | Referees: (Germany) Tijana Haack (Finland) Anniina Nurmi; Linesmen: (Finland) Jenni Heikkinen (Austria) Julia Kainberger |
| 6 min | Penalties | 0 min | Referees: (Germany) Tijana Haack (Finland) Anniina Nurmi; Linesmen: (Finland) Jenni Heikkinen (Austria) Julia Kainberger |
| 30 | Shots | 33 | Referees: (Germany) Tijana Haack (Finland) Anniina Nurmi; Linesmen: (Finland) Jenni Heikkinen (Austria) Julia Kainberger |

| 8 February 2022; 16:40 v | Japan | 3–2 GWS (1–0, 0–1, 1–1) (OT: 0–0) (SO: 1–0) | Czech Republic | Wukesong Arena, Beijing; Attendance: 638 |

Game reference

Nana Fujimoto
Goalies
Klára Peslarová
Referees:
(Russia) Daria Abrosimova
(Russia) Daria Ermak
Linesmen:
(Germany) Lisa Linnek
(Finland) Linnea Sainio

| H. Toko (Ao. Shiga, A. Toko) (PP) – 04:00 | 1–0 |
| | 1–1 | 26:09 – Křížová (Vanišová) |
| H. Toko (Kubo, A. Toko) (PP) – 40:23 | 2–1 |
| | 2–2 | 45:53 – Mlýnková |

Ukita (miss)
Kubo
Koyama (miss)
H. Toko (miss)
Ak. Shiga (miss)
Shootout
(miss) Pátková
(miss) Křížová
(miss) Pejzlová
(miss) Mrázová
(miss) Mills
6 min
Penalties
10 min
25
Shots
38

Quarterfinals

| 12 February 2022; 16:40 v | Finland | 7–1 (2–1, 2–0, 3–0) | Japan | Wukesong Arena, Beijing; Attendance: 675 |

Game reference

Anni Keisala
Goalies
Nana Fujimoto
Akane Konishi
Referees:
(Canada) Cianna Lieffers
(Switzerland) Anna Wiegand
Linesmen:
(Germany) Lisa Linnek
(Sweden) Veronica Lovensnö

| Nieminen (Tulus, Hiirikoski) (PP) – 02:08 | 1–0 |
| Vainikka (Laitinen, Holopainen) – 04:32 | 2–0 |
| | 2–1 | 15:01 – Shiga (H. Toko) |
| Karvinen (Nieminen, Tapani) – 25:01 | 3–1 |
| Nieminen (Karvinen, Laitinen) – 28:29 | 4–1 |
| Nieminen (Tapani, Hiirikoski) – 40:18 | 5–1 |
| Tapani (Karvinen, Nieminen) – 48:28 | 6–1 |
| Hakala (Niskanen, Laitinen) – 52:29 | 7–1 |

8 min
Penalties
4 min
49
Shots
25

== Luge ==
| Athlete | Event | Run 1 | | Run 2 | | Run 3 | | Run 4 | | Total | |
| Athlete | Event | Time | Rank | Time | Rank | Time | Rank | Time | Rank | Time | Rank |
|---|---|---|---|---|---|---|---|---|---|---|---|
| Seiya Kobayashi | Men's singles | 1:00.856 | 31 | 1:00.919 | 33 | 59.859 | 30 | did not advance | | 3:01.634 | 32 |

== Nordic combined ==
| Athlete | Event | Ski jumping | | | Cross-country | | Total | |
| Athlete | Event | Distance | Points | Rank | Time | Rank | Time | Rank |
|---|---|---|---|---|---|---|---|---|
| Akito Watabe | Normal hill/10 km | 98.0 | 114.1 | 9 | 24:24.1 | 4 | 25:40.1 | 7 |
| Akito Watabe | Large hill/10 km | 135.0 | 126.4 | 5 | 26:19.9 | 10 | 27:13.9 | 3rd place, bronze medalist(s) |
| Hideaki Nagai | Large hill/10 km | 117.0 | 83.7 | 32 | 27:28.9 | 28 | 31:12.9 | 31 |
| Ryota Yamamoto | Normal hill/10 km | 108.0 | 133.0 | 1 | 26:54.3 | 34 | 26:54.3 | 14 |
| Ryota Yamamoto | Large hill/10 km | 140.0 | 128.7 | 2 | 27:44.1 | 34 | 28:28.1 | 12 |
| Sora Yachi | Normal hill/10 km | 103.5 | 116.9 | 5 | 27:34.6 | 40 | 28:38.6 | 30 |
| Yoshito Watabe | Normal hill/10 km | 97.5 | 110.8 | 13 | 25:25.2 | 23 | 26:54.2 | 13 |
| Yoshito Watabe | Large hill/10 km | 118.0 | 94.4 | 27 | 27:08.7 | 22 | 30:10.7 | 25 |
| Akito Watabe; Hideaki Nagai; Ryota Yamamoto; Yoshito Watabe | Team large hill/4×5 km | 522.0 | 466.6 | 4 | 51:28.3 | 4 | 51:40.3 | 3rd place, bronze medalist(s) |

== Short track speed skating ==
Japan has qualified four male and three female short track speed skaters. They will participate in the men's and mixed relays as well.

Men

| Athlete | Event | Heat | | Quarterfinal | | Semifinal | | Final | |
| Athlete | Event | Time | Rank | Time | Rank | Time | Rank | Time | Rank |
|---|---|---|---|---|---|---|---|---|---|
| Katsunori Koike | 500 m | 41.199 | 4 | did not advance | | | | | 26 |
| Kazuki Yoshinaga | 1000 m | 1:25.574 | 3 AA | DSQ | | did not advance | | | 17 |
| Kazuki Yoshinaga | 1500 m | —N/a | | 2:12.450 | 2 Q | 2:14.014 | 3 QB | 2:18.585 | 16 |
| Kota Kikuchi | 500 m | 42.176 | 3 | did not advance | | | | | 22 |
| Kota Kikuchi | 1500 m | —N/a | | 2:15.243 | 4 | did not advance | | | 22 |
| Shogo Miyata | 1000 m | 1:24.367 | 4 | did not advance | | | | | 23 |
| Shogo Miyata | 1500 m | —N/a | | 2:13.799 | 5 | did not advance | | | 27 |
| Katsunori Koike; Kazuki Yoshinaga; Kota Kikuchi; Shogo Miyata | 5000 m relay | —N/a | | | | 6:40.446 | 3 QB | 6:40.545 | 8 |

Women

| Athlete | Event | Heat | | Quarterfinal | | Semifinal | | Final | |
| Athlete | Event | Time | Rank | Time | Rank | Time | Rank | Time | Rank |
|---|---|---|---|---|---|---|---|---|---|
| Shione Kaminaga | 1000 m | 1:28.465 | 4 | did not advance | | | | | 25 |
| Shione Kaminaga | 1500 m | —N/a | | 2:22.261 | 5 | did not advance | | | 27 |
| Sumire Kikuchi | 500 m | 42.829 | 3 q | 56.092 | 3 | did not advance | | | 12 |
| Sumire Kikuchi | 1000 m | 1:30.154 | 2 Q | 1:37.170 | 5 | did not advance | | | 19 |
| Sumire Kikuchi | 1500 m | —N/a | | 2:23.359 | 3 Q | No time | 6 ADV B | 2:37.915 | 8 |
| Yuki Kikuchi | 1000 m | 1:28.764 | 4 | did not advance | | | | | 27 |
| Yuki Kikuchi | 1500 m | —N/a | | 2:22.192 | 4 | did not advance | | | 23 |

Mixed

| Athlete | Event | Quarterfinal | | Semifinal | | Final | |
| Athlete | Event | Time | Rank | Time | Rank | Time | Rank |
|---|---|---|---|---|---|---|---|
| Katsunori Koike; Kazuki Yoshinaga; Kota Kikuchi; Shogo Miyata; Shione Kaminaga; Sumire Kikuchi; Yuki Kikuchi | 2000 m relay | 2:39.112 | 4 | did not advance | | | 10 |

Qualification legend: ADV – Advanced due to being impeded by another skater; FA – Qualify to medal round; FB – Qualify to consolation round; OR – Olympic record

== Ski jumping ==
Men

| Athlete | Event | Qualification | | | First round | | | Final | | | Total | |
| Athlete | Event | Distance | Points | Rank | Distance | Points | Rank | Distance | Points | Rank | Points | Rank |
|---|---|---|---|---|---|---|---|---|---|---|---|---|
| Junshiro Kobayashi | Large hill | 121.5 | 101.4 | 32 Q | 130.0 | 120.4 | 30 | 134.0 | 131.6 | 18 | 252.0 | 24 |
| Ryōyū Kobayashi | Large hill | 128.0 | 121.3 | 9 Q | 142.0 | 147.0 | 1 | 138.0 | 145.8 | 2 | 292.8 | 2nd place, silver medalist(s) |
| Naoki Nakamura | Large hill | 122.0 | 107.1 | 37 Q | 134.0 | 128.6 | 17 | 124.0 | 112.3 | 30 | 240.9 | 29 |
| Yukiya Sato | Large hill | 126.0 | 111.7 | 23 Q | 133.0 | 128.4 | 18 | 134.5 | 132.2 | 17 | 260.6 | 15 |
| Junshiro Kobayashi | Normal hill | 93.0 | 88.2 | 26 Q | 97.5 | 123.0 | 26 Q | 92.5 | 111.0 | 26 | 254.0 | 27 |
| Ryōyū Kobayashi | Normal hill | 99.0 | 111.4 | 4 Q | 104.5 | 145.4 | 1 Q | 99.5 | 129.6 | 5 | 275.0 | 1st place, gold medalist(s) |
| Naoki Nakamura | Normal hill | 88.5 | 87.0 | 29 Q | 93.5 | 114.5 | 38 | did not advance | | | | |
| Yukiya Sato | Normal hill | 100.0 | 103.6 | 10 Q | 95.0 | 118.1 | 32 | did not advance | | | | |
| Junshiro Kobayashi; Naoki Nakamura; Ryoyu Kobayashi; Yukiya Sato | Team large hill | —N/a | | | 513 | 438.5 | 5 | 498.5 | 444.3 | 6 | 882.8 | 5 |

Women

| Athlete | Event | First round | | | Final | | | Total | |
| Athlete | Event | Distance | Points | Rank | Distance | Points | Rank | Points | Rank |
|---|---|---|---|---|---|---|---|---|---|
| Kaori Iwabuchi | Normal hill | 94.5 | 94.8 | 11 | 83.0 | 74.8 | 24 | 169.6 | 18 |
| Sara Takanashi | Normal hill | 98.5 | 108.7 | 5 | 100.0 | 115.4 | 4 | 224.1 | 4 |
| Yuka Seto | Normal hill | 94.5 | 94.6 | 13 | 83.5 | 81.9 | 19 | 176.5 | 14 |
| Yuki Ito | Normal hill | 94.0 | 95.5 | 10 | 82.0 | 81.2 | 20 | 176.7 | 13 |

Mixed

| Athlete | Event | First round | | | Final | | | Total | |
| Athlete | Event | Distance | Points | Rank | Distance | Points | Rank | Points | Rank |
|---|---|---|---|---|---|---|---|---|---|
| Ryōyū Kobayashi; Yukiya Sato; Sara Takanashi; Yuki Ito | Mixed team | 332.9 | 359.9 | 8 | 378.5 | 476.4 | 2 | 836.3 | 4 |

== Snowboarding ==
Freestyle
Men

| Athlete | Event | Qualification | | | | | Final | | | | |
| Athlete | Event | Run 1 | Run 2 | Run 3 | Best | Rank | Run 1 | Run 2 | Run 3 | Best | Rank |
|---|---|---|---|---|---|---|---|---|---|---|---|
| Kaito Hamada | Big air | 80.75 | 41.75 | 55.75 | 136.50 | 15 | did not advance | | | | |
| Hiroaki Kunitake | Big air | 83.75 | 61.50 | 74.50 | 158.25 | 4 Q | 82.25 | 50.25 | 84.00 | 166.25 | 4 |
| Takeru Otsuka | Big air | 68.50 | 75.50 | 91.50 | 160.00 | 2 Q | 17.25 | 95.00 | 33.75 | 128.75 | 9 |
| Ruki Tobita | Big air | 25.75 | 16.25 | 20.25 | 46.00 | 29 | did not advance | | | | |
| Ayumu Hirano | Halfpipe | 87.25 | 93.25 | —N/a | 93.25 | 1 Q | 33.75 | 91.75 | 96.00 | 96.00 | 1st place, gold medalist(s) |
| Kaishu Hirano | Halfpipe | 74.75 | 77.25 | —N/a | 77.25 | 9 Q | 75.50 | 37.75 | 15.75 | 75.50 | 9 |
| Ruka Hirano | Halfpipe | 80.75 | 87.00 | —N/a | 87.00 | 3 Q | 13.00 | 11.75 | 9.25 | 13.00 | 12 |
| Yūto Totsuka | Halfpipe | 84.50 | 12.00 | —N/a | 84.50 | 6 Q | 62.00 | 69.75 | 26.50 | 69.75 | 10 |
| Kaito Hamada | Slopestyle | 56.06 | 67.45 | —N/a | 67.45 | 12 Q | 25.90 | 15.91 | 59.36 | 59.36 | 8 |
| Hiroaki Kunitake | Slopestyle | 50.36 | 51.43 | —N/a | 51.43 | 21 | did not advance | | | | |
| Takeru Otsuka | Slopestyle | 32.93 | 74.93 | —N/a | 74.93 | 6 Q | 52.75 | 50.58 | 52.80 | 52.80 | 10 |
| Ruki Tobita | Slopestyle | 29.23 | 56.58 | —N/a | 56.58 | 19 | did not advance | | | | |

Women

| Athlete | Event | Qualification | | | | | Final | | | | |
| Athlete | Event | Run 1 | Run 2 | Run 3 | Best | Rank | Run 1 | Run 2 | Run 3 | Best | Rank |
|---|---|---|---|---|---|---|---|---|---|---|---|
| Reira Iwabuchi | Big air | 83.00 | 75.50 | 11.75 | 158.50 | 3 Q | 83.75 | 82.25 | 37.00 | 166.00 | 4 |
| Kokomo Murase | Big air | 85.00 | 72.75 | 86.00 | 171.00 | 2 Q | 80.00 | 91.50 | 12.00 | 171.50 | 3rd place, bronze medalist(s) |
| Miyabi Onitsuka | Big air | 80.75 | 72.25 | 73.50 | 154.25 | 5 Q | 9.50 | 54.50 | 10.75 | 65.25 | 11 |
| Reira Iwabuchi | Slopestyle | 48.51 | 67.00 | —N/a | 67.00 | 11 Q | 75.60 | 80.03 | 46.15 | 80.03 | 5 |
| Kokomo Murase | Slopestyle | 74.95 | 81.45 | —N/a | 81.45 | 2 Q | 48.50 | 49.05 | 48.00 | 49.05 | 10 |
| Miyabi Onitsuka | Slopestyle | 42.60 | 46.58 | —N/a | 46.58 | 19 | did not advance | | | | |
| Kurumi Imai | Halfpipe | 54.75 | 49.75 | —N/a | 54.75 | 15 | did not advance | | | | |
| Mitsuki Ono | Halfpipe | 79.50 | 83.75 | —N/a | 83.75 | 2 Q | 71.50 | 25.50 | 29.00 | 71.50 | 9 |
| Ruki Tomita | Halfpipe | 74.25 | 66.25 | —N/a | 74.25 | 6 Q | 16.50 | 19.75 | 80.50 | 80.50 | 5 |
| Sena Tomita | Halfpipe | 75.75 | 52.00 | —N/a | 75.75 | 5 Q | 86.00 | 88.25 | 9.25 | 88.25 | 3rd place, bronze medalist(s) |

Parallel

| Athlete | Event | Qualification | | Round of 16 | Quarterfinal | Semifinal | Final | |
| Athlete | Event | Time | Rank | Opposition Time | Opposition Time | Opposition Time | Opposition Time | Rank |
|---|---|---|---|---|---|---|---|---|
| Tsubaki Miki | Women's giant slalom | 1:27.15 | 3 Q | Kotnik (SLO); L DNF | did not advance | | | 9 |
| Tomoka Takeuchi | Women's giant slalom | 1:28.83 | 15 Q | Hofmeister (GER); L DNF | did not advance | | | 15 |

Cross

| Athlete | Event | Seeding | | 1/8 final | Quarterfinal | Semifinal | Final | |
| Athlete | Event | Time | Rank | Position | Position | Position | Position | Rank |
|---|---|---|---|---|---|---|---|---|
| Yoshiki Takahara | Men's | 1:19.16 | 23 | 1 Q | DNF | did not advance | | 16 |
| Yuka Nakamura | Women's | DNS | 32 | DNS | did not advance | | | |

== Speed skating ==
Men

| Athlete | Event | Race | |
| Athlete | Event | Time | Rank |
|---|---|---|---|
| Wataru Morishige | 500 m | 34.50 | 3rd place, bronze medalist(s) |
| Yuma Murakami | 500 m | 34.57 | 8 |
| Tatsuya Shinhama | 500 m | 35.12 | 20 |
| Wataru Morishige | 1000 m | 1:09.47 | 16 |
| Ryota Kojima | 1000 m | 1:09.97 | 20 |
| Tatsuya Shinhama | 1000 m | 1:10.00 | 21 |
| Seitaro Ichinohe | 1500 m | 1:45.53 | 10 |
| Takuro Oda | 1500 m | 1:46.60 | 17 |
| Seitaro Ichinohe | 5000 m | 6:19.81 | 12 |
| Ryosuke Tsuchiya | 10000 m | 13:02.49 | 11 |

Women

| Athlete | Event | Race | |
| Athlete | Event | Time | Rank |
|---|---|---|---|
| Arisa Go | 500 m | 37.983 | 15 |
| Nao Kodaira | 500 m | 38.09 | 17 |
| Miho Takagi | 500 m | 37.12 | 2nd place, silver medalist(s) |
| Nao Kodaira | 1000 m | 1:15.65 | 10 |
| Miho Takagi | 1000 m | 1:13.19 OR | 1st place, gold medalist(s) |
| Ayano Sato | 1500 m | 1:54.92 | 4 |
| Miho Takagi | 1500 m | 1:53.72 | 2nd place, silver medalist(s) |
| Nana Takagi | 1500 m | 1:55.34 | 8 |
| Ayano Sato | 3000 m | 4:03:40 | 9 |
| Miho Takagi | 3000 m | 4:01.77 | 6 |
| Momoka Horikawa | 5000 m | 7:06.92 | 10 |
| Misaki Oshigiri | 5000 m | 7:01.17 | 8 |

Mass start

| Athlete | Event | Semifinal | | | Final | | |
| Athlete | Event | Points | Time | Rank | Points | Time | Rank |
|---|---|---|---|---|---|---|---|
| Ryosuke Tsuchiya | Men's mass start | 7 | 7:48.43 | 6 Q | 6 | 7:58.82 | 6 |
| Seitaro Ichinohe | Men's mass start | 3 | 7:58.54 | 8 Q | 3 | 7:58.82 | 8 |
| Ayano Sato | Women's mass start | 40 | 8:28.77 | 2 Q | 3 | 8:16.94 | 8 |
| Nana Takagi | Women's mass start | 0 | 9:10.03 | 14 | did not advance | | 27 |

Team pursuit

| Athlete | Event | Quarterfinal | | Semifinal | Final | |
| Athlete | Event | Time | Rank | Opposition Time | Opposition Time | Rank |
|---|---|---|---|---|---|---|
| Ayano Sato; Miho Takagi; Nana Takagi | Women's team pursuit | 2:53.61 | 1 Q | ROC; W 2:58.93 FA | Canada; L 3:04.47 | 2nd place, silver medalist(s) |

== See also ==
- Japan at the 2022 Winter Paralympics
