= Snowboarding at the 2025 Asian Winter Games – Women's halfpipe =

Women's halfpipe at the 2025 Asian Winter Games
- Venue: Yabuli Ski Resort
- Dates: 12–13 February 2025
- Competitors: 10 from 3 nations

Medalists
gold medal	Sara Shimizu	Japan
silver medal	Sena Tomita	Japan
bronze medal	Wu Shaotong	China

The women's halfpipe at the 2025 Asian Winter Games was held on 12 and 13 February 2025 at Yabuli Ski Resort in Harbin, China.

== Schedule ==
All times are China Standard Time (UTC+08:00)

Date	Time	Event
Wednesday, 12 February 2025	10:00	Qualification
Thursday, 13 February 2025	11:00	Final

== Results ==
Legend

- DNI — Did not improve

=== Qualification ===
Rank	Athlete	Run 1	Run 2	Best
1	Sara Shimizu (JPN)	88.50	98.00	98.00
2	Sena Tomita (JPN)	90.50	93.75	93.75
3	Wu Shaotong (CHN)	86.50	DNI	86.50
4	Cai Xuetong (CHN)	83.00	DNI	83.00
5	Liu Yibo (CHN)	77.50	DNI	77.50
6	Yang Lu (CHN)	71.75	DNI	71.75
7	Lee Na-yoon (KOR)	62.25	DNI	62.25
8	Choi Seo-woo (KOR)	43.00	45.25	45.25
9	Heo Young-hyun (KOR)	38.25	DNI	38.25
10	Rise Kudo (JPN)	21.75	26.25	26.25

=== Final ===
Rank	Athlete	Run 1	Run 2	Run 3	Best
1st place, gold medalist(s)	Sara Shimizu (JPN)				
2nd place, silver medalist(s)	Sena Tomita (JPN)				
3rd place, bronze medalist(s)	Wu Shaotong (CHN)				
4	Cai Xuetong (CHN)				
5	Liu Yibo (CHN)				
6	Yang Lu (CHN)				
7	Lee Na-yoon (KOR)				
8	Choi Seo-woo (KOR)				
9	Heo Young-hyun (KOR)				
10	Rise Kudo (JPN)				

- The final was cancelled due to weather conditions. Qualification results would be considered as final results.
