= Snowboarding at the 2022 Winter Olympics – Qualification =

These are the qualification rules and the quota allocation for the snowboarding events at the 2022 Winter Olympics.

== Qualification standard ==
A total of 238 athletes are scheduled to qualify to compete in the snowboarding events (119 men and 119 women). A country can enter a maximum of 26 athletes across all events, with a maximum of 14 per gender. A total of eight quotas (one per event) is reserved for the host nation, if it fails to qualify in that respective event. Each event also has a minimum FIS points total required per athlete, along with a top 30 finish at a World Cup event during the qualification period (1 July 2019 or 2020 in Parallel giant slalom, to 16 January 2022), or 2021 FIS Snowboarding World Championships. A total of 16 NOC's will qualify for the mixed team snowboard cross event. The athlete quota per event is listed below.

Event	Men	Women	Minimum FIS points
Big air/Slopestyle	30	30	50.00
Halfpipe	25	25	50.00
Parallel giant slalom	32	32	100.00
Snowboard cross	32	32	100.00
238 quotas	119	119	

- Big air and slopestyle have a combined event quota.

== Allocation of quotas ==
At the end of the qualification period of 16 January 2022 quotas will be awarded using the Olympic Quota Allocation List (which includes all results of the World Cups from July 2019 and the results of the 2021 World Championship, except PGS which is only from July 2020). The spots will be awarded to each country per athlete appearing on the list starting at number one per event until a maximum for each event is reached, except for the snowboard cross events which will stop at 24 of 32. Once an NOC has reached the maximum of 4 quota spots in an event, it will no longer be counted for the allocation of quotas. If a nation goes over the total of 14 per sex or 26 total it is up to that nation to select its team to meet the rules by 18 January 2022. Any vacated spots will be then awarded in that event starting from the first athlete not to be awarded a quota. Slopestyle and Big Air are calculated as one event.

=== Allocation for the mixed team snowboard cross event ===
Any nation that has qualified at least one competitor from each gender, may enter this event. If less than sixteen teams have the required number of athletes then NOCs that need either one more male or female competitor will be awarded a quota to enable participation in the team event. Once sixteen teams are formed, and if there is still less than 32 quotas filled in the male or female events, then the allocation process described above will continue. If there are not sixteen teams formed then NOCs who can form a second team will be ranked to fill remaining vacancies.

=== Additional participation for already qualified athletes ===
The halfpipe will have quota limits of 25 athletes in both male and female events. However, athletes who have qualified in slopestyle or big air, and have met the qualification standard in halfpipe, may also compete bringing the event totals up to a maximum of 30 per gender. Similarly the slopestyle and big air events may include athletes who have qualified in halfpipe as long as each event total does not exceed 30 per gender.

=== Host country places ===
If the host China has not earned at least one quota place in each event they will be entitled to one quota within the prescribed maximums, provided the athlete has met the qualification standard.

== Current summary ==
As of 22 January 2022.

NOC	Men				Women				Mixed	Total
NOC	HP	PGS	SC	SS/BA	HP	PGS	SC	SS/BA	SBXT	Total
Andorra							1			1
Australia	2		4	1	1		2	1	2X	11
Austria		4	4	1		~~4~~ 3	1	1	X	14
Belgium								1		1
Bulgaria		1								1
Canada	1	3	3	4	2	3	4	~~4~~ 3	2X	23
China	3	1	~~1~~ 0	1	4	2	1	1		13
Croatia								1		1
Czech Republic			1		1	2	~~2~~ 1	1	~~X~~	6
Finland				2				2		4
France	1		3				4	1	2X	9
Germany	3	3	3	2	1	~~4~~ 3	1	1	X	17
Great Britain			1				1	1	X	3
Hungary					1					1
Ireland	1									1
Italy	2	4	4	1		2	4		2X	17
Japan	4	~~1~~ 0	1	4	4	2	1	4	~~X~~	20
Malta					1					1
Netherlands			1	1		1		1		4
Norway				3				~~2~~ 1		4
New Zealand	~~1~~ 0			1				2		3
Poland		2				3				5
ROC		4	1	1		4	4		X	14
Slovakia								1		1
Slovenia	1	3				1		1		6
South Korea		2			~~2~~ 1	1				4
Spain			1		1					2
Sweden				2						2
Switzerland	3	3	1	2	~~3~~ 1	4	~~4~~ 3	2	X	19
Ukraine						1				1
United States	4	2	4	4	4		4	4	2X	26
Total: 29 NOCs	25	32	32	30	22	32	32	30	16	235

=== Next eligible NOC per event ===
The following list shows the next five (or less) eligible NOCs. A country can be eligible for more than one quota spot per event in the reallocation process.

Women

Halfpipe	Parallel	Snowboard Cross	Slopestyle/Big Air
~~Canada~~; ~~Switzerland~~	~~Canada~~; Slovenia; Czech Republic; Japan; China	ROC; ~~Austria~~; ~~Germany~~; ~~Great Britain~~; ~~Austria~~; ~~Switzerland~~; Andorra	Switzerland; Croatia; ROC; Spain; Belgium

Men

Halfpipe	Parallel	Snowboard Cross	Slopestyle/Big Air
Italy; China; Canada; South Korea; Switzerland	United States; Canada; China; United States; France	France; Germany; Switzerland; France; Spain	Belgium; Switzerland; Norway; Switzerland; France

Mixed

Snowboard Cross Team
Australia
