= Snowboarding at the 2024 Winter Youth Olympics – Women's halfpipe =

Women's halfpipe at the IV Winter Youth Olympic Games
- Venue: Welli Hilli Park
- Dates: 1 February
- Competitors: 15 from 9 nations
- Winning points: 90.75

Medalists
| 1st place, gold medalist(s) | | Rise Kudo | Japan |
| 2nd place, silver medalist(s) | | Sara Shimizu | Japan |
| 3rd place, bronze medalist(s) | | Lura Wick | Switzerland |

The women's halfpipe event in snowboarding at the 2024 Winter Youth Olympics took place on 1 February at the Welli Hilli Park.

== Qualification ==
The qualification was started at 10:15.

| Rank | Bib | Name | Country | Run 1 | Run 2 | Best | Notes |
|---|---|---|---|---|---|---|---|
| 1 | 2 | Rise Kudo | Japan | 92.25 | 91.25 | 92.25 | Q |
| 2 | 1 | Sara Shimizu | Japan | 83.75 | 89.00 | 89.00 | Q |
| 3 | 11 | Anne Hedrich | Germany | 70.75 | 77.75 | 77.75 | Q |
| 4 | 4 | Sonora Alba | United States | 74.75 | 70.50 | 74.75 | Q |
| 5 | 12 | Lura Wick | Switzerland | 66.25 | 71.50 | 71.50 | Q |
| 6 | 8 | Kona Ettel | Germany | 66.75 | 68.00 | 68.00 | Q |
| 7 | 6 | Ai Yanyi | China | 65.50 | 64.50 | 65.50 | Q |
| 8 | 5 | Rochelle Weinberg | United States | 63.50 | 51.25 | 63.50 | Q |
| 9 | 3 | Felicity Geremia | Canada | 58.50 | 60.50 | 60.50 | Q |
| 10 | 15 | Choi Seo-woo | South Korea | 48.75 | 14.75 | 48.75 | Q |
| 11 | 9 | Amelie Haskell | Australia | 47.25 | 31.75 | 47.25 | |
| 12 | 7 | Sascha Elvy | Australia | 42.75 | 41.00 | 42.75 | |
| 13 | 10 | Lily-Ann Ulmer | Canada | 36.50 | 39.50 | 39.50 | |
| 14 | 13 | Ava Beer | New Zealand | 35.00 | 33.00 | 35.00 | |
| 15 | 14 | Heo Young-hyun | South Korea | 33.00 | 30.75 | 33.00 | |

== Final ==
The final was started at 13:30.

| Rank | Bib | Name | Country | Run 1 | Run 2 | Run 3 | Total |
|---|---|---|---|---|---|---|---|
| 1st place, gold medalist(s) | 2 | Rise Kudo | Japan | 90.75 | 73.25 | 68.25 | 90.75 |
| 2nd place, silver medalist(s) | 1 | Sara Shimizu | Japan | 84.50 | 19.50 | 63.00 | 84.50 |
| 3rd place, bronze medalist(s) | 12 | Lura Wick | Switzerland | 78.00 | 35.00 | 74.75 | 78.00 |
| 4 | 4 | Sonora Alba | United States | 74.00 | 29.50 | 25.75 | 74.00 |
| 5 | 8 | Kona Ettel | Germany | 69.75 | 64.25 | 68.50 | 69.75 |
| 6 | 11 | Anne Hedrich | Germany | 68.25 | 13.00 | 24.25 | 68.25 |
| 7 | 6 | Ai Yanyi | China | 60.50 | 26.75 | 13.00 | 60.50 |
| 8 | 5 | Rochelle Weinberg | United States | 58.75 | 23.75 | 58.25 | 58.75 |
| 9 | 3 | Felicity Geremia | Canada | 43.00 | 47.50 | 46.50 | 47.50 |
| 10 | 15 | Choi Seo-woo | South Korea | 40.75 | 37.50 | 16.00 | 40.75 |
