= Berenice Wicki =

Swiss snowboarder (born 2002)

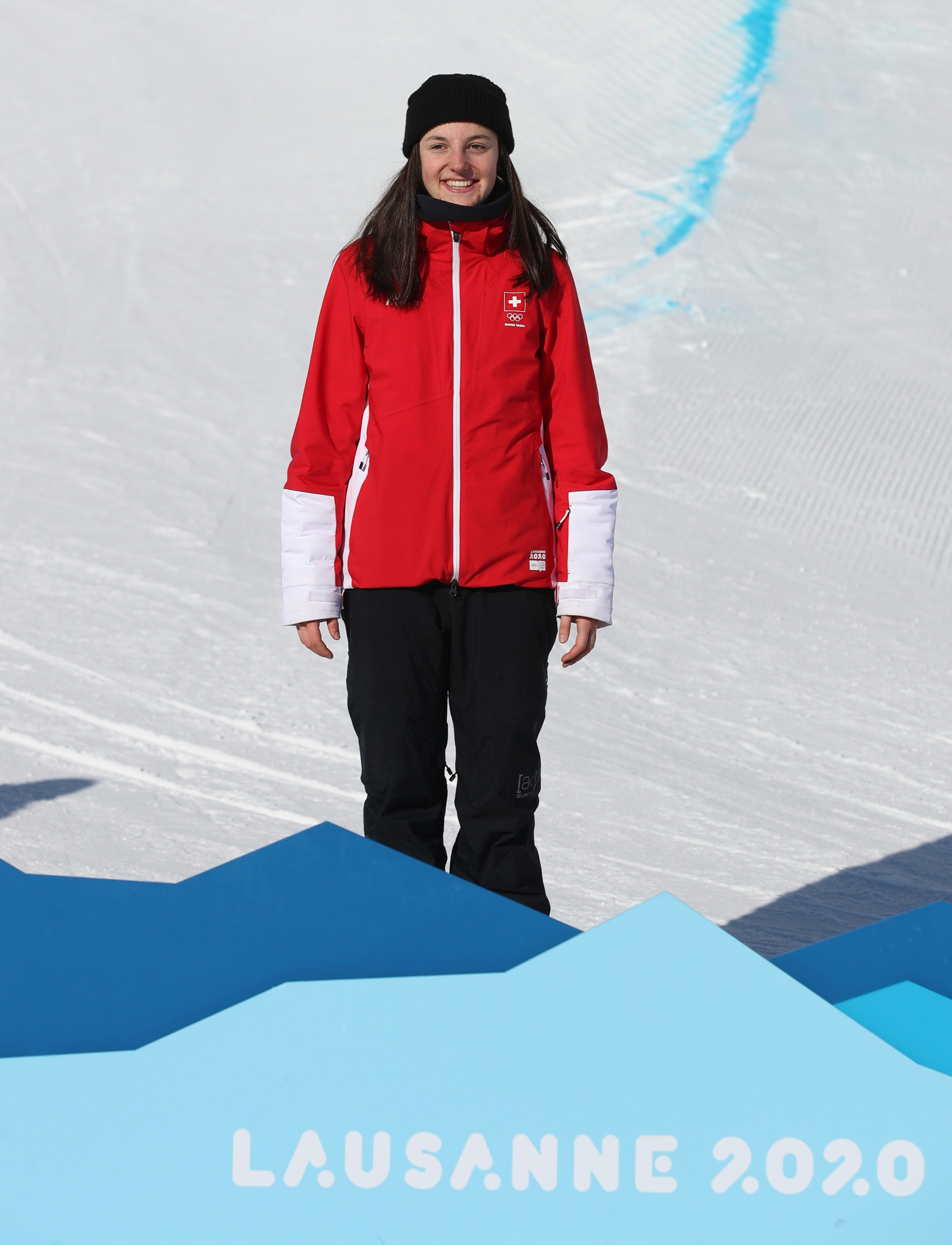
- Wicki at the 2020 Winter Youth Olympics

Personal information
- Nationality: Switzerland
- Born: 24 September 2002 (age 23)
- Parent: Jodok Wicki (father)
- Website: berenicewicki.com

Sport
- Sport: Snowboarding
- Event: Halfpipe
Medal record
Women's snowboarding
Representing Switzerland
Winter Youth Olympic Games
| Bronze medal – third place | 2020 Lausanne | Halfpipe |
Junior World Championships
| Gold medal – first place | 2017 Laax | Halfpipe |

Berenice Wicki (born 24 September 2002) is a Swiss snowboarder who competes in the halfpipe discipline. She represented Switzerland at the 2022 Winter Olympics.

== Career ==
At the 2015–16 FIS Snowboard Europa Cup #13 in Davos, Wicki won in the women's halfpipe #1 event.

Wicki medaled gold at the 2017 FIS Snowboarding Junior World Championships in Laax. In the 2018 Junior World Championships in Cardrona, Wicki ranked 6th. At the 2019 Junior World Championships in Leysin, Wicki ranked 5th. In the 2018–19 FIS Snowboard Europa Cup #19 in Crans-Montana, Wicki won in the women's halfpipe event.

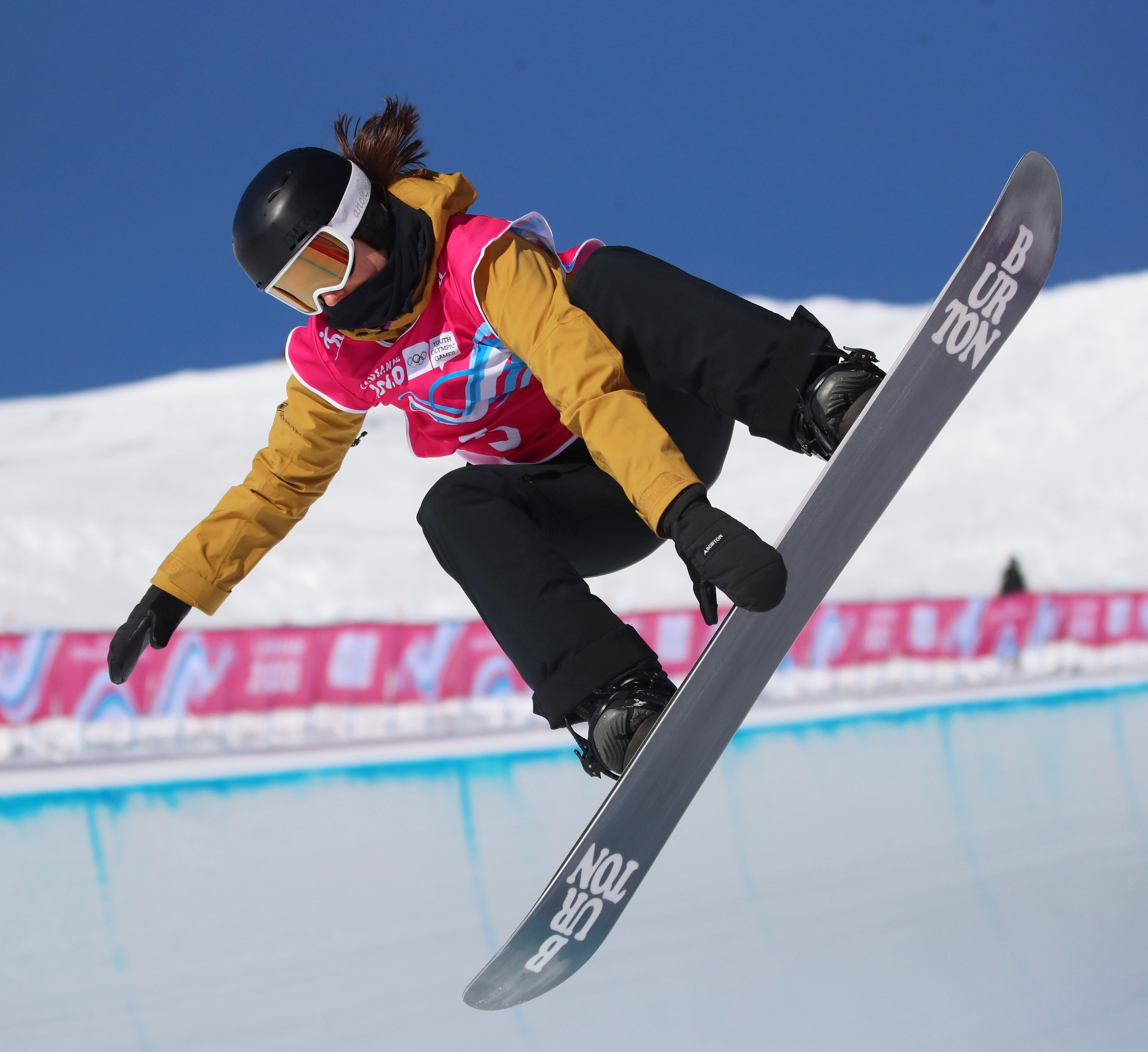
Wicki at the 2020 Winter Youth Olympics

Wicki represented Switzerland at the 2020 Winter Youth Olympics in the girls' halfpipe event, where she medaled bronze with a score of 81.33.

At the 2021 FIS Freestyle Ski and Snowboarding World Championships, Wicki ranked 17th in the women's snowboard halfpipe event; she did not qualify for the final.

Wicki represented Switzerland at the 2022 Winter Olympics and ranked 7th in the women's halfpipe event, failing to medal.

At the 2023 FIS Freestyle Ski and Snowboarding World Championships, she placed 8th in the women's snowboard halfpipe event.
