= Choi Ga-on =

South Korean snowboarder (born 2008)

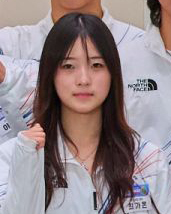
- Choi in 2026

Personal information
- Born: 3 November 2008 (age 18) Seoul, South Korea

Korean name
- Hangul: 최가온
- RR: Choe Gaon
- MR: Ch'oe Kaon

Sport
- Country: South Korea
- Sport: Snowboarding
- Event: Halfpipe
Medal record
Women's snowboarding
Representing South Korea
Olympic Games
Gold medal – first place	2026 Milano Cortina	Halfpipe
Junior World Championships
Gold medal – first place	2022 Leysin	Halfpipe
Winter X Games
Gold medal – first place	2023 Aspen	SuperPipe

Choi Ga-on (Korean: 최가온; pronounced [tɕʰwɛ ɡɑon]; born 3 November 2008) is a South Korean snowboarder.

== Career ==
Choi competed at the 2022 FIS Snowboarding Junior World Championships where she won a gold medal in the halfpipe event. In January 2023, she competed at the Winter X Games XXVII and won a gold medal in the SuperPipe event. At 14 years, two months, she broke Chloe Kim's record as the youngest X Games snowboard halfpipe gold medalist.

During the 2023–24 FIS Snowboard World Cup, Choi made her World Cup debut on 16 December 2023 and won the halfpipe event with a score of 92.75, defeating the 2022–23 FIS Snowboard World Cup crystal globe winner Mitsuki Ono.

During the 2025–26 FIS Snowboard World Cup season opener on 11 December 2025 she won the halfpipe event with a score of 92.75. A week later on 19 December 2025, she won the halfpipe for the second consecutive week with a score of 94.50. She was the only rider in the final to score above 90 points. On 17 January 2026 she won her third consecutive World Cup halfpipe event.

In January 2026, Choi was selected to represent South Korea at the 2026 Winter Olympics. She competed in the halfpipe event and won a gold medal with a score of 90.25. She overcame a leg injury during competition to defeat two-time Olympic gold medalist Chloe Kim, becoming the first South Korean athlete to win gold in snowboarding at the Winter Olympics. At 17 years, 101 days, she became the youngest Olympic gold medalist in snowboarding history, surpassing the previous record set by Red Gerard at the 2018 Winter Olympics.
