= Malta at the 2022 Winter Olympics =

- Flag of Malta
- IOC code: MLT
- NOC: Malta Olympic Committee
- Website: www.nocmalta.org

in Beijing, China 4–20 February 2022
- Competitors: 1 (0 men and 1 woman) in 1 sport
- Flag bearer (opening): Jenise Spiteri
- Flag bearer (closing): Volunteer
- Medals: Gold 0 Silver 0 Bronze 0 Total 0

Winter Olympics appearances (overview)
- 2014; 2018; 2022; 2026

Malta sent a delegation to compete at the 2022 Winter Olympics in Beijing, China, from 4 to 20 February 2022. It was the country's third Winter Olympic appearance. Malta's athlete consisted of snowboarder Jenise Spiteri, who also carried the Maltese flag during the opening ceremony. She took part in the women's halfpipe and ranked 21. A volunteer was the flagbearer during the closing ceremony.

== Background ==
Malta first sent a delegation to compete in the Summer Olympics in the 1928 Amsterdam Games. They have competed in most Summer Olympics since, missing the Olympics only in five occasions between 1928 and 2016. These were in 1932, 1952, 1956, 1964, and 1976. In spite of this, they did not send a delegation to the Winter Olympics until the 2014 Winter Olympics in Sochi, Russia. This 2022 Winter Olympics, held from 4 to 20 February, was the country's third Winter Olympic appearance, after the 2018 Winter Olympics. Jenise Spiteri was the only competitor sent to the Beijing games. She was chosen as the flag bearer for the opening ceremony, while a volunteer bore the flag in the closing ceremony.

== Competitors ==
The following is the list of number of competitors participating at the Games per sport/discipline.

Sport	Men	Women	Total
Snowboarding	0	1	1
Total	0	1	1

== Snowboarding ==
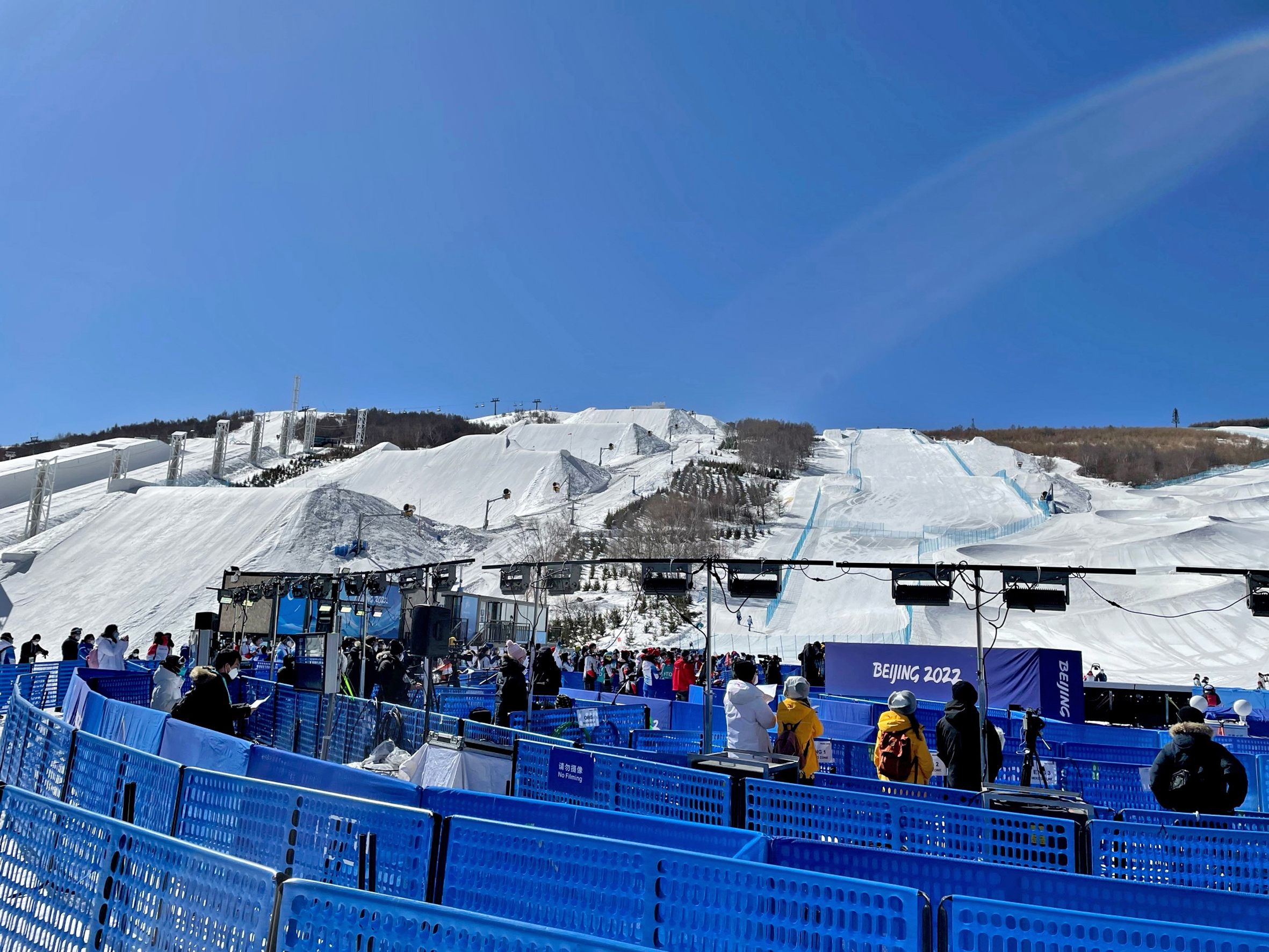
Genting Resort Secret Garden, where the snowboard skiing events were held.

Malta qualified one female snowboarder, Jenise Spiteri, in the halfpipe event. This marked Malta's Winter Olympics debut in the sport. Jenise Spiteri was 29 years old at the time of Beijing Games. It had been a goal of Spiteri to compete in snowboarding at the Olympics.

On 9 February 2022, Spiteri participated in women's halfpipe qualification round. In this round, each skier was given two runs, with the best of the two runs determining placement; the top 12 were allowed to advance. In her first run, Spiteri scored 7.25 points, and a higher 25.25 points in her second run. This put her in the 21st place and thus she did not qualify.

Athlete	Event	Qualification				Final				
Athlete	Event	Run 1	Run 2	Best	Rank	Run 1	Run 2	Run 3	Best/Total	Rank
Jenise Spiteri	Women's halfpipe	7.25	25.25	25.25	21	did not advance				

== Non-competing sports ==
=== Alpine skiing ===
By meeting the basic qualification standards, Malta qualified one female alpine skier. That skier, Élise Pellegrin, Malta's only Winter Olympian before this edition, however, was not selected for the team due to lack of recent competition, meaning that her performance would not be of her usual standard.
