= Maddie Mastro =

American snowboarder (born 2000)

Personal information
- Born: February 22, 2000 (age 26) Wrightwood, California, U.S.
- Height: 5 ft 5 in (165 cm)
- Weight: 110 lb (50 kg)

Sport
- Country: United States
- Sport: Snowboarding
- Event: Half pipe
- Club: Mammoth Mountain Snowboard Team
Medal record
Women's snowboarding
Representing the United States
World Championships
Silver medal – second place	2021 Aspen	Halfpipe
Bronze medal – third place	2019 Utah	Halfpipe
Winter X Games
Silver medal – second place	2021 Aspen	SuperPipe
Silver medal – second place	2023 Aspen	SuperPipe
Silver medal – second place	2025 Aspen	SuperPipe
Bronze medal – third place	2018 Aspen	SuperPipe

Maddie Mastro (born February 22, 2000) is an American professional snowboarder, specializing in half pipe. She won a bronze medal in the superpipe competition at the 2018 X Games in Aspen.

== Career ==
Mastro was named to the US Team for the 2018 Winter Olympics, placing 12th.

In 2019, she won the Burton US Open Snowboarding Championships, and during that competition, she landed the first double crippler 900 in women's snowboarding competition.

In her second Olympics in the 2022 Beijing Winter Olympics women's halfpipe, Mastro placed thirteenth, the second highest American, just missing qualifying for the final round (top twelve qualify).

On January 18, 2025 at the Laax Open, Mastro became one of the first two women to land a double cork 1080 in a snowboard halfpipe competition, landing a frontside double cork 1080 after Chloe Kim landed a cab double cork 1080 earlier that day.

In her third Olympics in the 2026 Milano Cortina Winter Olympics women's halfpipe, she placed third in the qualification and twelfth in the final.
