= Jodok Wicki =

Swiss sailor

Personal information
- Nationality: Swiss
- Born: 20 July 1966 (age 58)

Sport
- Sport: Sailing

Jodok Wicki (born 20 July 1966) is a Swiss sailor. He competed at the 1988 Summer Olympics and the 1992 Summer Olympics.
