= Sara Shimizu =

Japanese snowboarder (born 2009)

Personal information
- Born: 12 November 2009 (age 16) Ōtsu, Shiga Prefecture, Japan

Sport
- Country: Japan
- Sport: Snowboarding
- Event: Halfpipe
Medal record
Women's snowboarding
Representing Japan
World Championships
Silver medal – second place	2025 Engadin	Halfpipe
Asian Winter Games
Gold medal – first place	2025 Harbin	Halfpipe
Winter Youth Olympics
Silver medal – second place	2024 Gangwon	Halfpipe

Sara Shimizu (清水 さら, Shimizu Sara; born 12 November 2009) is a Japanese snowboarder who competes in the halfpipe events.

== Career ==
She won a silver medal in the women's halfpipe event at the 2024 Winter Youth Olympics.
