= Maddy Schaffrick =

American snowboarder (born 1994)

Personal information
- Born: Madeline Schaffrick; April 29, 1994 (age 32) Steamboat Springs, Colorado, U.S.

Sport
- Country: United States
- Sport: Snowboarding
- Event: Half pipe
- Club: Steamboat Springs Winter Sports Club

Madeline "Maddy" Schaffrick (born April 29, 1994) is an American professional snowboarder, specializing in half pipe. She represented the United States in halfpipe at the 2026 Winter Olympics, her first Olympic Games.

== Career ==
Born and raised in Steamboat Springs, Colorado, Schaffrick learned to ski at an early age, but transitioned to snowboard at age seven after locking herself in her bedroom until her parents let her switch from skis. She turned pro at age 14, traveling internationally and competing in the Winter X Games. Starting in 2010, she suffered from multiple knee injuries requiring surgery, including a torn ACL and torn MCL. She narrowly missed qualifying for the 2010 and 2014 Winter Olympics. In 2015, after seven years on the U.S. Snowboard Team, she retired due to mental health difficulties and burnout.

After her first retirement, Schaffrick returned to Steamboat Springs and worked as a plumber. She also worked as a youth snowboarding coach, eventually becoming an assistant coach with the U.S. national team in 2022. In 2024, Schaffrick began training in an attempt to return to professional competition.

In December 2024, at her first World Cup event in nine years, Schaffrick earned her first career World Cup podium with a third-place finish at Secret Garden, China. She was selected to the U.S. team for the 2025 FIS Snowboard World Championships, making the final in halfpipe and finishing 11th. In January 2026, she recorded a second-place finish at the U.S. Grand Prix in Aspen.
