= Akane Konishi =

Japanese ice hockey player

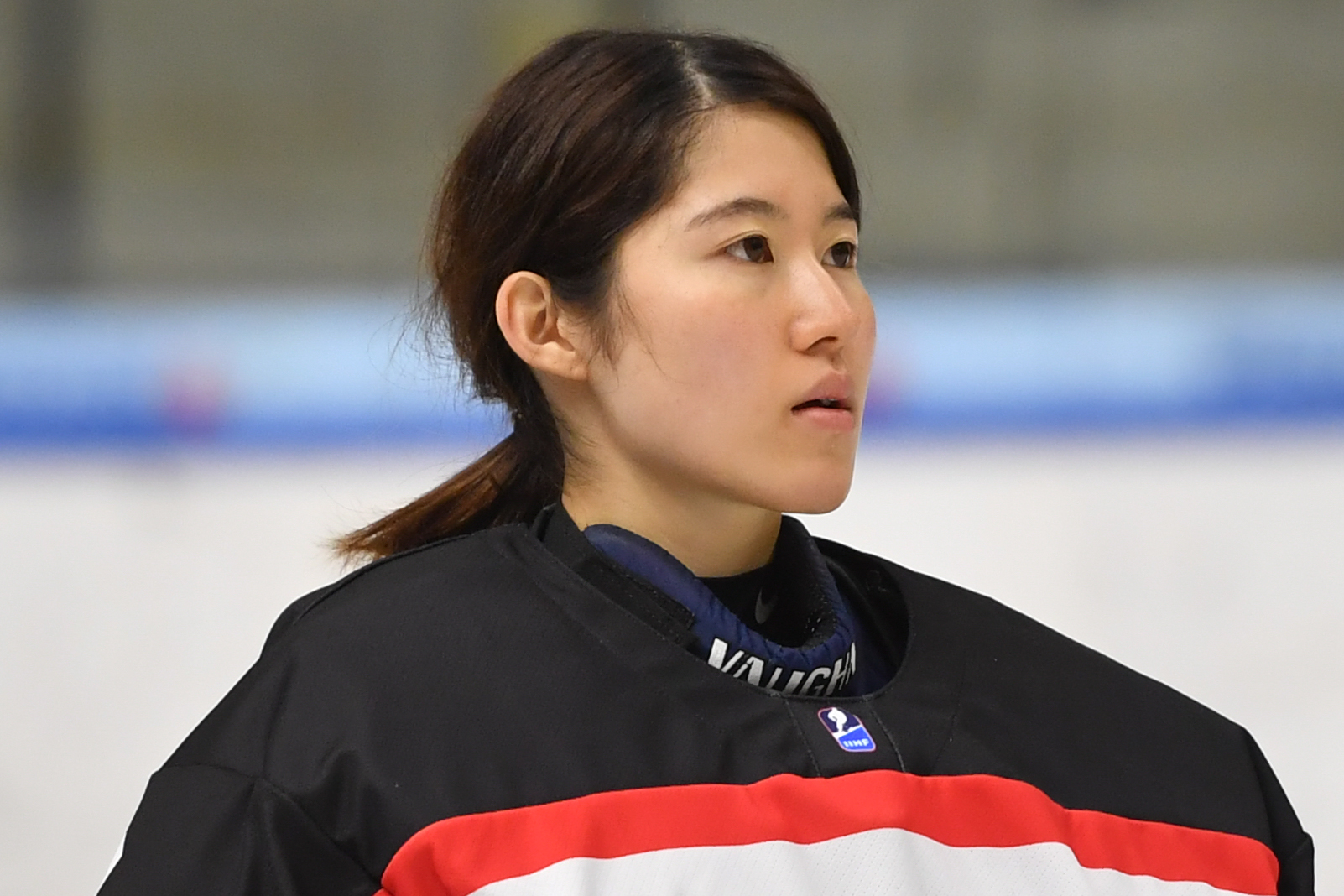
- Konishi in 2017
- Born: 14 August 1995 (age 30) Kushiro, Japan
- Height: 1.66 m (5 ft 5 in)
- Weight: 62 kg (137 lb; 9 st 11 lb)
- Position: Goaltender
- Catches: Left
- JWIHC team: Seibu Rabbits
- National team: Japan
- Playing career: 2013–present

Akane Konishi (小西 あかね, Konishi Akane; born 14 August 1995) is a Japanese ice hockey goaltender for the Seibu Rabbits.

== International career ==
Konishi was selected for the Japan women's national ice hockey team in the 2014 Winter Olympics. She played in one game, not allowing a goal in relief of Nana Fujimoto. She also competed at the 2018 Winter Olympics.

Konishi made two appearances for the Japan women's national under-18 ice hockey team at the IIHF World Women's U18 Championships, with the first in 2012.

== Career statistics ==
=== International ===
Year	Team	Event	Result	GP	W	L	T/OT	MIN	GA	SO	GAA	SV%
2012	Japan U18	U18 DI	3rd	1	1	0	0	40:00	0	1	0.00	1.000
2013	Japan U18	U18 DI	1st	4	3	0	0	245:00	6	1	1.47	0.917
2014	Japan	OG	7th	1	0	0	0	23:34	0	0	0.00	1.000
2018	Japan	OG	6th	1	1	0	0	60:00	1	0	1.00	0.923
2022	Japan	OG	6th	2	1	1	0	17:06	1	-	3.51	0.929
