= Mitsuki Ono =

Japanese snowboarder (born 2004)

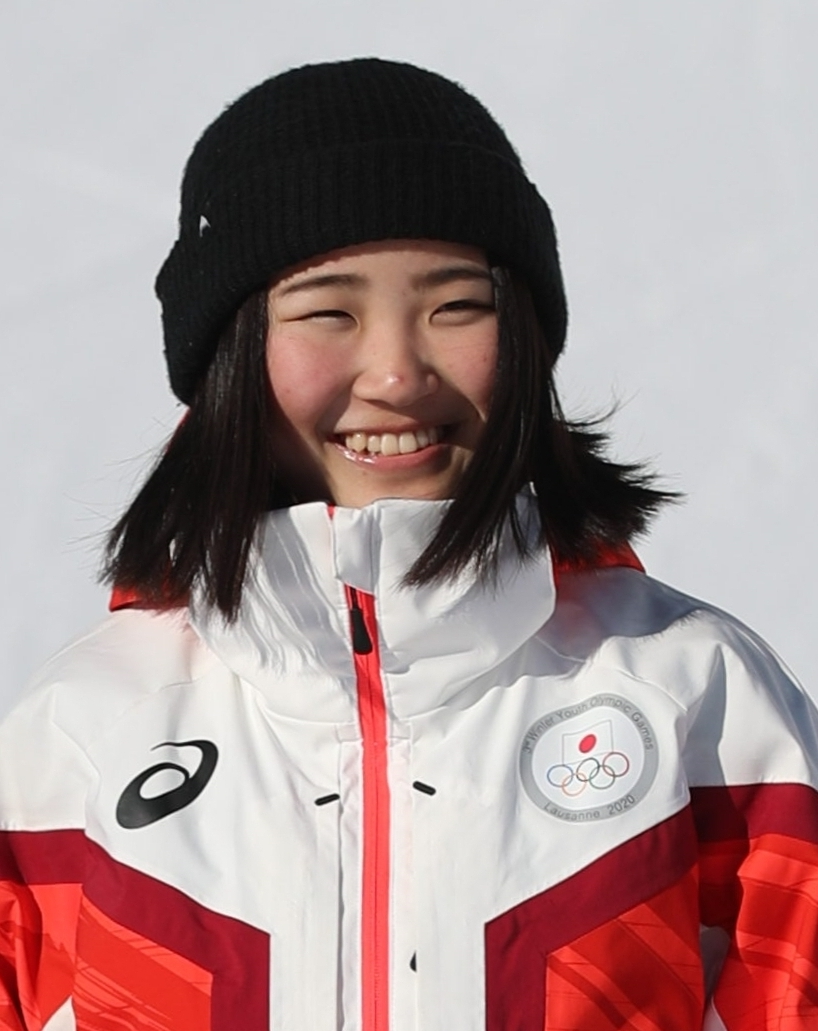
- Ono at the 2020 Winter Youth Olympics

Personal information
- Born: 5 March 2004 (age 22) Saitama, Japan

Sport
- Sport: Snowboarding
- Event: Halfpipe
Medal record
Women's snowboarding
Representing Japan
Olympic Games
Bronze medal – third place	2026 Milano Cortina	Halfpipe
World Championships
Bronze medal – third place	2023 Bakuriani	Halfpipe
Bronze medal – third place	2025 Engadin	Halfpipe
Winter Youth Olympic Games
Gold medal – first place	2020 Lausanne	Halfpipe
Junior World Championships
Gold medal – first place	2018 Cardrona	Halfpipe
Gold medal – first place	2019 Leysin	Halfpipe

Mitsuki Ono (小野 光希, Ono Mitsuki; born 5 March 2004) is a Japanese snowboarder. She represented Japan at the 2022 and 2026 Winter Olympics.

== Career ==
Ono made her international debut at the 2018 FIS Snowboarding Junior World Championships and won a gold medal in the halfpipe event. She competed at the 2019 FIS Snowboarding Junior World Championships and again won a gold medal in the halfpipe event. She then represented Japan at the 2020 Winter Youth Olympics and won a gold medal in the halfpipe event with a score of 95.33.

Ono represented Japan at the 2022 Winter Olympics in the halfpipe event. She then represented Japan at the 2023 FIS Snowboard World Championships and won a bronze medal in the halfpipe event with a score of 83.00. She represented Japan at the 2025 FIS Snowboard World Championships and again won a bronze medal in the halfpipe event with a score of 88.50.

In January 2026, she was again selected to represent Japan at the 2026 Winter Olympics. She competed in the halfpipe event and won a bronze medal with a score of 85.00.
