= Rise Kudo =

Japanese snowboarder (born 2009)

Personal information
- Born: 28 August 2009 (age 16) Sapporo, Japan

Sport
- Country: Japan
- Sport: Snowboarding
- Event: Halfpipe
Medal record
Women's snowboarding
Representing Japan
Winter Youth Olympics
Gold medal – first place	2024 Gangwon	Halfpipe

Rise Kudo (born 28 August 2009) is a Japanese snowboarder who competes in the halfpipe events. She won a gold medal in the Women's halfpipe event at the 2024 Winter Youth Olympics.
