= Cai Xuetong =

Chinese snowboarder (born 1993)

Xuetong Cai
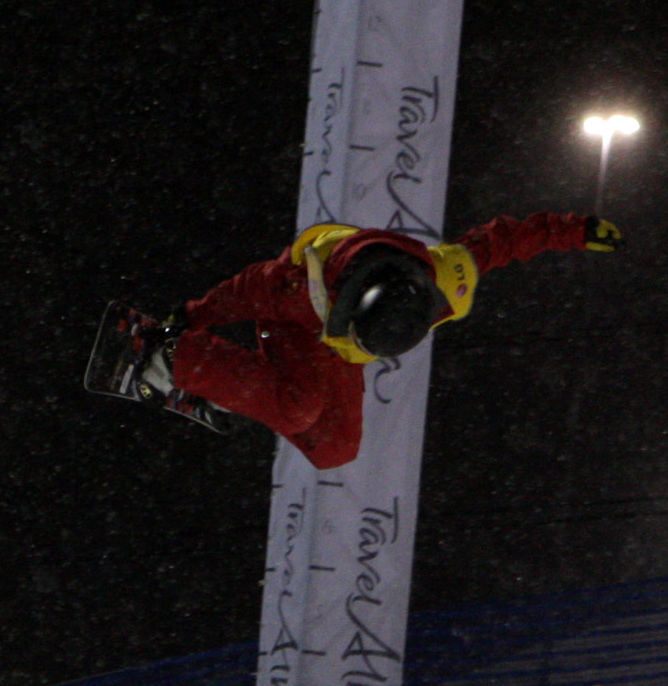
- Cai in 2010

Personal information
- Born: 26 September 1993 (age 32) Harbin, China
- Height: 1.61 m (5 ft 3 in)
- Weight: 55 kg (121 lb)

Sport
- Country: China
- Sport: Snowboarding
- Event: Halfpipe
Medal record
Women's snowboarding
Representing China
World Championships
Gold medal – first place	2015 Kreischberg	Halfpipe
Gold medal – first place	2017 Sierra Nevada	Halfpipe
Gold medal – first place	2023 Bakuriani	Halfpipe
Silver medal – second place	2019 Utah	Halfpipe
Winter X Games
Silver medal – second place	2017 Aspen	SuperPipe
Bronze medal – third place	2016 Aspen	SuperPipe
Bronze medal – third place	2019 Aspen	SuperPipe
Bronze medal – third place	2023 Aspen	SuperPipe
Winter Universiade
Gold medal – first place	2015 Granada	Halfpipe
Winter Asian Games
Silver medal – second place	2017 Sapporo	Halfpipe

Cai Xuetong (Chinese: 蔡雪桐; pinyin: Cài Xuětóng; Mandarin pronunciation: [tsʰâɪ ɕɥè tʰʊ̌ŋ]; born 26 September 1993) is a Chinese snowboarder.

== 2010 Olympics ==
Cai represented China at the 2010 Winter Olympics in Vancouver, competing in the halfpipe discipline. She was the youngest competitor in the competition.

== FIS Snowboard World Championships ==
Cai claimed the gold medal at the 2015 halfpipe events at the FIS Snowboard World Championships, and the silver medal in 2019.

== FIS Snowboard World Cup ==
At the FIS Snowboard World Cup, Cai topped the halfpipe rankings in 2009–10, 2010–11, 2011–12, 2015–16, and 2018–19, as well as the freestyle overall ranking in 2010–11 and 2011–12. She has claimed 10 wins and 23 podiums in 32 starts.
