= Haruna Matsumoto =

Japanese snowboarder (born 1993)

Personal information
- Nationality: Japanese
- Born: 26 July 1993 (age 32) Sapporo, Hokkaido
- Height: 1.57 m (5 ft 2 in)
- Weight: 52 kg (115 lb)

Sport
- Country: Japan
- Sport: Snowboarding
- Event: Halfpipe
Medal record
Women's Snowboarding
FIS Snowboard World Championships
Silver medal – second place	2017 Sierra Nevada	Halfpipe
Winter X Games
Bronze medal – third place	2020 Aspen	Superpipe
Bronze medal – third place	2021 Aspen	Superpipe
Bronze medal – third place	2022 Aspen	Superpipe

Haruna Matsumoto (松本 遥奈, Matsumoto Haruna; born 26 July 1993) is a Japanese snowboarder. She competed in the 2018 Winter Olympics.
