= Amelie Haskell =

Australian snowboarder (born 2008)

Personal information
- Born: 8 January 2008 (age 18) North Sydney, New South Wales, Australia
- Home town: Avalon Beach, New South Wales, Australia
- Education: Forest Charter School

Sport
- Country: Australia
- Sport: Snowboarding
- Event: Halfpipe
- Club: Northstar (junior club)

Amelie Haskell (born 8 January 2008) is an Australian snowboarder who competes in women's halfpipe. She represented Australia at the 2026 Winter Olympics in women's halfpipe.

== Career ==
Haskell's first major multi-sport event was the 2024 Winter Youth Olympics in Gangwon, where she competed in the women's halfpipe and placed 11th in qualification at Welli Hilli Park.

In early 2024 she finished fourth in the U.S. National Championships halfpipe at Copper Mountain and placed second in a FIS-sanctioned halfpipe event at Mammoth Mountain (California).

She made her World Cup debut at Copper Mountain in December 2024, and recorded a breakthrough result in Aspen in February 2025, finishing 13th after qualifying. Her progress was recognised with selection for the FIS Snowboard World Championships in Engadin in 2025, where she placed 23rd in qualification on debut.

During the 2025–26 season Haskell recorded an eighth-place finish at the Buttermilk World Cup (Aspen) in January 2026.
