= Jenise Spiteri =

Maltese-American snowboarder (born 1992)

Personal information
- National team: United States (2011–2015); Malta (2015–present)
- Born: September 20, 1992 (age 33) Redwood City, California, U.S.
- Education: Sierra Nevada College
- Height: 5 ft 4 in (163 cm)

Sport
- Sport: Snowboarding

Jenise Lynae Spiteri (born September 20, 1992) is a Maltese-American snowboarder. The first Maltese Olympic snowboarder, she competed in the halfpipe event at the 2022 Winter Olympics.

== Biography ==
Spiteri was born on September 20, 1992, in Redwood City, California. She has Maltese ancestry, with her grandfather having emigrated to the United States from there after his home was destroyed in World War II. She grew up initially wanting to be an actress, appearing in several commercials when young.

== Snowboarding career ==
Spiteri began her snowboarding career in 2010 while at Sierra Nevada College, after writing a social media post that read "Wanted: someone to teach me how to ride pipe tomorrow. Anyone available?"

Spiteri competed for the team at Sierra Nevada and decided her goal was to represent Malta at the Winter Olympic Games. A teammate made the suggestion and Spiteri realized it made sense as a way to pay homage to her grandfather, who died in 2010, as he had a connection to the Olympics through his company that produced figure-skating equipment for Olympians such as Michelle Kwan.

Despite going through several injuries, including a torn ACL in 2012, another in 2017 as well as a torn meniscus the latter year, Spiteri continued snowboarding. She was a top-15 finisher for Malta at the 2014–15 FIS Snowboard World Cup and just barely missed qualifying for the 2018 Winter Olympics by one spot, despite competing through her ACL and meniscus injuries. As snowboarding is expensive, Spiteri lived out of a car, then a van, and worked several odd jobs (including being an extra in Euphoria) while reusing her gear each season, additionally opening a GoFundMe account to help pay for the costs. She also ran several social media accounts, gaining over 30,000 subscribers on YouTube.

Spiteri finally qualified for the Olympics in 2022, and thus became Malta's first Olympic snowboarder, their only participant at the 2022 games, and only their second participant all-time at the Winter Olympics in any sport. She served as Malta's flag bearer and competed in the women's halfpipe event, placing 21st, eating a bao between runs that she forgot she had kept in her pocket.

== Acting career ==
Spiteri appeared in commercials before moving onto modeling and more acting during her younger years in San Francisco. Outside of snowboarding she does work as extra on TV series and movies.

== Filmography ==
=== Films ===
Year	Film	Role	Notes	Ref.
2020	Tape	Annie	Short movie	

=== TV Series ===
Year	Series	Role	Notes	Ref.
2026	Ted	Inmate	Extra, Season 2 Episode 7: "Susan Is the New Black"	
