= Zoe Kalapos =

American professional snowboarder

Personal information
- Born: April 17, 1997 (age 28) Beverly Hills, Michigan, U.S.
- Home town: Vail, Colorado, U.S.

Sport
- Country: United States
- Sport: Snowboarding
- Event: Half pipe
- Club: Vail Ski and Snowboard Academy

Zoe Kalapos (born April 17, 1997) is an American professional snowboarder, specializing in half-pipe. Kalapos was named to the US Team for the 2022 Winter Olympics, finishing 17th.

== Early life ==
At the age of one, Kalapos was gifted a snowboard by her parents, Steven and Maria. After three years of switching to skis, she went back to snowboarding at the age of five, growing a passion for the sport. Steven would eventually build a homemade ski and snowboard park in the one-acre lot of his farm for Zoe for her to practice on, named Mt. Kalapos.

At the age of 10, Kalapos began her competitive career. At the age of 13, Zoe and the rest of her family (with the exception of her mother, who had to stay in Detroit as a teacher in the South Redford School District for income-related reasons) would move to Vail, Colorado to join the Vail Ski and Snowboard Academy.

== Career ==
In 2022, Team USA announced that she had been selected to represent the United States at the 2022 Winter Olympics in Beijing, China. her first Winter Olympics. She finished seventeenth in the women's halfpipe, missing qualifying for the finals, which required finishing in the top twelve.

Kalapos is an Ambassador of the Boyne Forever Foundation, a public charity created to amplify the positive impact of Boyne Resorts.

== Personal life ==
Kalapos' father was a former ski instructor in the 1980s, and her mother is a schoolteacher.

In 2021, Kalapos graduated from Westminster College.
