= Qiu Leng =

Chinese snowboarder (born 1997)

Personal information
- Nationality: Chinese
- Born: 29 September 1997 (age 28) Qinhuangdao, Hebei
- Height: 1.67 m (5 ft 6 in)

Sport
- Country: China
- Sport: Snowboarding
- Event: Halfpipe
Medal record
Representing China
Winter Universiade
Silver medal – second place	2019 Krasnoyarsk	Halfpipe

Qiu Leng (Chinese: 邱冷; pinyin: Qiū Lěng; Mandarin pronunciation: [tɕʰjóʊ lə̀ŋ]; born 29 September 1997) is a Chinese snowboarder, specializing in half pipe. She competed in the 2018 Winter Olympics, placing 16th.
