= Kurumi Imai =

Japanese snowboarder (born 1999)

Personal information
- Nationality: Japanese
- Born: 24 September 1999 (age 26) Ueda, Nagano, Japan
- Height: 1.48 m (4 ft 10 in)

Sport
- Country: Japan
- Sport: Snowboarding
- Event: Halfpipe
Medal record
Representing Japan
Winter X Games
Silver medal – second place	2020 Aspen	Superpipe
Winter Universiade
Gold medal – first place	2019 Krasnoyarsk	Halfpipe

Kurumi Imai (今井 胡桃, Imai Kurumi; born 24 September 1999) is a Japanese snowboarder. She competed in the 2018 Winter Olympics.
