= Sena Tomita =

Japanese snowboarder (born 1999)

Personal information
- Nationality: Japan
- Born: 5 October 1999 (age 26) Myoko, Niigata, Japan
- Height: 1.60 m (5 ft 3 in)

Sport
- Sport: Snowboarding
Medal record
Women's snowboarding
Representing Japan
Olympic Games
Bronze medal – third place	2022 Beijing	Halfpipe
Asian Winter Games
Silver medal – second place	2025 Harbin	Halfpipe
Winter X Games
Gold medal – first place	2022 Aspen	Superpipe

Sena Tomita (冨田 せな, Tomita Sena; born 5 October 1999) is a Japanese snowboarder. She competed in the 2018 Winter Olympics, and the 2022 Winter Olympics, where she won the bronze medal in the halfpipe event.

== Career ==
In 2022, Tomita won a gold medal in the halfpipe event at the 2022 Winter X Games In Aspen.

For the 2022-2023 season, she announced she would not compete due to health issues.

== Personal life ==
Her younger sister is snowboarder Ruki Tomita.
