= Brooke D'Hondt =

Canadian snowboarder (born 2005)

Personal information
- Born: 9 March 2005 (age 21) Calgary, Alberta, Canada

Sport
- Country: Canada
- Sport: Snowboarding
- Event: Halfpipe

Brooke D'Hondt (born 9 March 2005) is a Canadian snowboarder who competes internationally in the halfpipe discipline.

== Career ==
D'Hondt made her debut at the age of 14 at the 2020 Winter X Games, where she would finish sixth.

On January 19, 2022, D'Hondt was named to Canada's 2022 Olympic team in the halfpipe event. D'Hondt was the youngest person named to the Canadian team.
