= Wu Shaotong =

Chinese snowboarder (born 1998)

Personal information
- Born: 13 December 1998 (age 27) Heilongjiang, China

Sport
- Country: China
- Sport: Snowboarding
- Event: Halfpipe
Medal record
Women's snowboarding
Representing China
Asian Winter Games
| Bronze medal – third place | 2025 Harbin | Halfpipe |
Winter Universiade
| Silver medal – second place | 2019 Krasnoyarsk | Halfpipe |

Wu Shaotong (Chinese: 武绍桐; pinyin: Wǔ Shàotóng; born 13 December 1998) is a Chinese snowboarder. She represented China at the 2022 Winter Olympics.

== Career ==
Wu competed at the 2019 Winter Universiade and won a bronze medal in the halfpipe event with a score of 70.50. On 23 January 2022, she was selected to represent China at the 2022 Winter Olympics.

Wu competed at the 2025 Asian Winter Games in the halfpipe event and won a bronze medal. She finished third in qualification with a score of 86.50. The finals were cancelled due to strong winds, and the qualification results were considered the final results.

During the 2022–23 FIS Snowboard World Cup, she earned her first career World Cup podium finish on 21 January 2023, finishing in second place. During the 2025–26 FIS Snowboard World Cup, she earned her second career World Cup podium finish on 3 January 2026, winning a silver medal with a score of 77.25.
