= Elizabeth Hosking =

Canadian snowboarder (born 2001)

Personal information
- Born: July 22, 2001 (age 24) Longueuil, Quebec, Canada
- Height: 163 cm (5 ft 4 in)
- Weight: 57 kg (126 lb)
- Website: https:/elizabethhosking.ca/

Sport
- Country: Canada
- Sport: Snowboarding
- Team: Team Canada

Achievements and titles
- Olympic finals: 2022 Winter Olympics
Medal record
Women's snowboarding
Representing Canada
World Championships
Silver medal – second place	2023 Bakuriani	Halfpipe

Elizabeth Hosking (born July 22, 2001) is a Canadian snowboarder, competing in the discipline of half-pipe.

== Career ==
=== Olympics ===
In January 2018, Hosking was named to Canada's 2018 Olympic team, placing 19th in the halfpipe competition. Hosking was the youngest member of the Canadian team.

In January 2022, Hosking was named to Canada's 2022 Olympic team where she placed 6th in the finals.

In January 2026, Hosking would win her first World Cup gold in Calgary.
