= Emily Arthur =

Australian snowboarder (born 1999)

Personal information
- Born: 24 April 1999 (age 27) Sydney, New South Wales, Australia

Sport
- Country: Australia
- Sport: Snowboarding
- Event: Halfpipe
Medal record
Women's snowboarding
Representing Australia
Youth Olympic Games
Silver medal – second place	2016 Lillehammer	Halfpipe

Emily Arthur (born 24 April 1999) is an Australian snowboarder who competes internationally.

She represented Australia at the 2018 Winter Olympics, placing 11th.
