= List of flag bearers for Moldova at the Olympics =

Moldova at the Olympics
- IOC code: MDA
- NOC: National Olympic Committee of the Republic of Moldova
- Website: www.olympic.md (in Romanian)
- Medals: Gold 0 Silver 3 Bronze 7 Total 10

Summer appearances
- 1996; 2000; 2004; 2008; 2012; 2016; 2020; 2024

Winter appearances
- 1994; 1998; 2002; 2006; 2010; 2014; 2018; 2022; 2026

Other related appearances
- Russian Empire (1900–1912); Romania (1924–1936); Soviet Union (1952–1988); Unified Team (1992)

This is a list of flag bearers who have represented Moldova at the Olympics.

Flag bearers carry the national flag of their country at the opening ceremony of the Olympic Games.

#	Event year	Season	Flag bearer	Sport
1	1994	Winter	Vasily Gherghy	Biathlon
2	1996	Summer	Vadim Vacarciuc	Weightlifting
3	1998	Winter	Ion Bucșa	Biathlon
4	2000	Summer	Vadim Vacarciuc	Weightlifting
5	2002	Winter	Ion Bucșa	Cross-country skiing
6	2004	Summer	Oleg Moldovan	Shooting
7	2006	Winter	Natalia Levchenkova	Biathlon
8	2008	Summer	Nicolai Ceban	Wrestling
9	2010	Winter	Victor Pînzaru	Cross-country skiing
10	2012	Summer	Dan Olaru	Archery
11	2014	Winter	Victor Pînzaru	Cross-country skiing
12	2016	Summer	Nicolai Ceban	Wrestling
13	2018	Winter	Nicolae Gaiduc	Cross-country skiing
14	2020	Summer	Alexandra Mîrca	Archery
14	2020	Summer	Dan Olaru	Archery
15	2022	Winter	Doina Descalui	Luge
16	2024	Summer	Dan Olaru	Archery
16	2024	Summer	Alexandra Mîrca	Archery

== See also ==
- Moldova at the Olympics
