= Cristina Bucșa =

Spanish tennis player (born 1998)

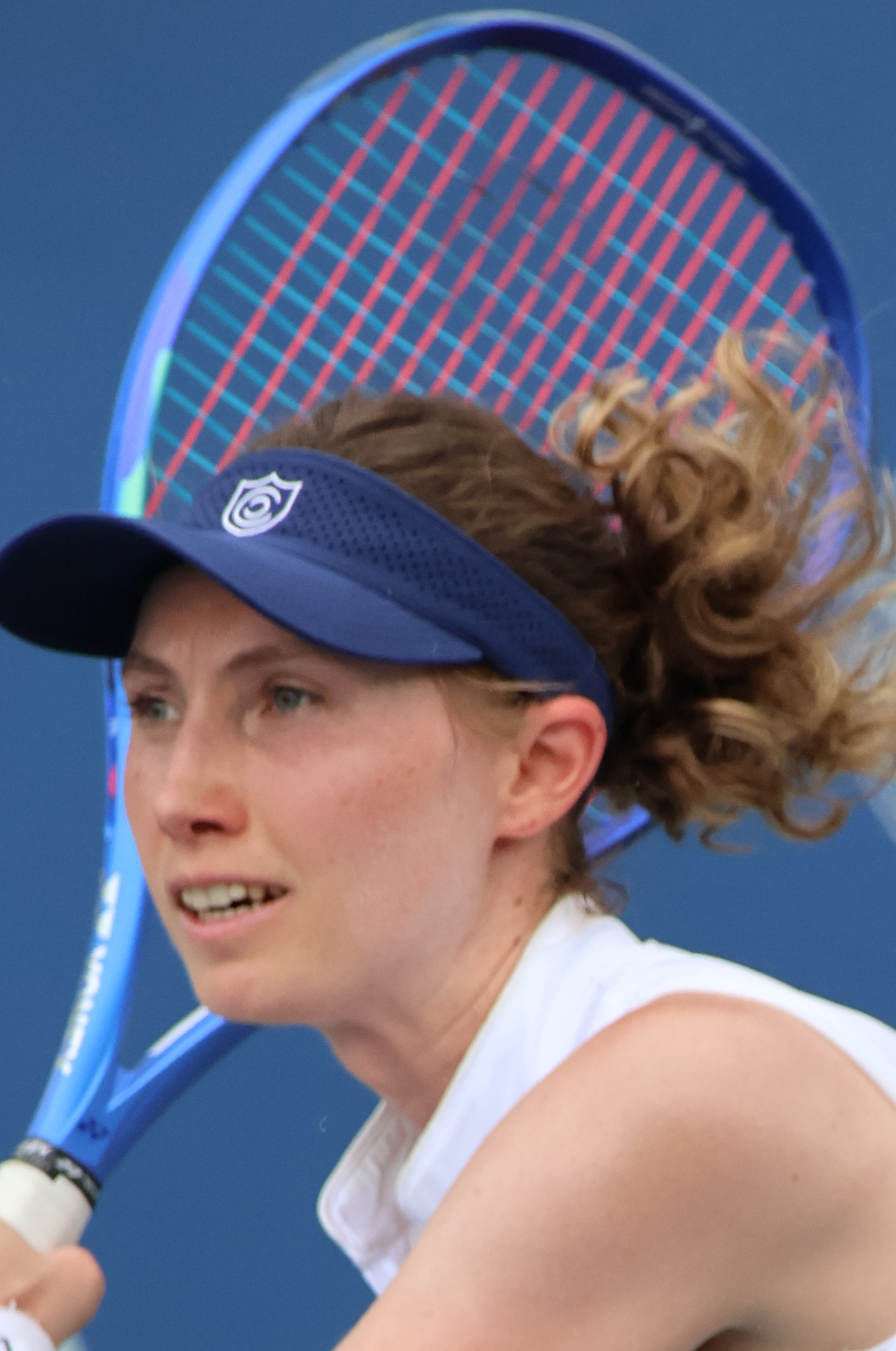
- Bucșa at the 2025 DC Open
- Full name: Cristina Bucsa
- Country (sports): Moldova (2013–2015); Spain (2015–)
- Residence: Torrelavega, Spain
- Born: 1 January 1998 (age 28) Chișinău, Moldova
- Height: 1.76 m (5 ft 9 in)
- Turned pro: 2016
- Plays: Right-handed (two-handed backhand)
- Coach: Ion Bucșa
- Prize money: US$ 5,624,196

Singles
- Career record: 383–277
- Career titles: 1
- Highest ranking: No. 30 (16 March 2026)
- Current ranking: No. 38 (12 October 2026)

Grand Slam singles results
- Australian Open: 3R (2023)
- French Open: 2R (2024)
- Wimbledon: 3R (2025)
- US Open: 4R (2025)

Other tournaments
- Olympic Games: 2R (2024)

Doubles
- Career record: 251–166
- Career titles: 9
- Highest ranking: No. 13 (12 October 2026)
- Current ranking: No. 13 (12 October 2026)

Grand Slam doubles results
- Australian Open: QF (2024)
- French Open: 3R (2024, 2026)
- Wimbledon: 2R (2024)
- US Open: QF (2026)

Grand Slam mixed doubles results
- Australian Open: 1R (2025)
- French Open: QF (2026)
- Wimbledon: 2R (2024)
- US Open: 2R (2024)

Team competitions
- BJK Cup: 3–3
Medal record
Women's tennis
Representing Spain
Olympic Games
Bronze medal – third place	2024 Paris	Doubles
- Last updated on: 22 November 2026.

Cristina Bucsa (Romanian: Cristina Bucșa; born 1 January 1998) is a Moldovan-Spanish professional tennis player. She has career-high WTA rankings of No. 30 in singles, achieved in March 2026, and No. 13 in doubles, achieved on 12 October 2026. She is the current No. 1 Spanish WTA player in singles and in doubles.

Her most notable result is a bronze medal in doubles at the 2024 Summer Olympics, with Sara Sorribes Tormo. She also has won ten WTA Tour titles combined, one in singles and nine in doubles.

== Early life ==
Bucșa was born in Chișinău, Moldova. Her father, Ion Bucșa, is a former Olympic biathlete who was Moldova's flag bearer at the 1998 and 2002 Winter Olympics. When she was three years old, her family moved to Cantabria in northern Spain; they originally moved to Las Fraguas before settling in Torrelavega. Bucșa attended the Instituto Marqués De Santillana in Torrelavega, where she was awarded the title of Illustrious Alumna in December 2022. She speaks Spanish, Romanian, English, and French.

Bucșa began playing tennis at the age of five. In 2014, she moved to Barcelona to train at the Centre d'Alt Rendiment de Sant Cugat del Vallès, but in 2016 she moved back to Torrelavega where she currently lives and trains. She is coached by her father, who is self-taught and also acts as her physiotherapist. Being unsponsored, she buys her own kits and rackets for the tour. She does not have any public social media profiles, only using Facebook to keep in touch with other tennis players.

She received her Spanish passport in 2014 and began representing Spain in 2015.

== Career ==
=== 2017–2020: ITF Circuit titles ===
Bucșa won her first ITF Circuit titles in both singles and doubles in 2017. In May 2017, she won the 15k event in Santarém, defeating Valeria Savinykh in the final. In November 2017, she and doubles partner Yana Sizikova won the 2017 Open de Valencia, defeating Georgina García Pérez and Andrea Gámiz in the final.

She entered the qualifiers of the 2019 Wimbledon Championships, but lost to Samantha Murray Sharan in the second round. One month later, she won the Open Araba en Femenino with a win over Shalimar Talbi in the final.

=== 2021–2022: Major and WTA 1000 debuts ===
She entered the singles main draw of a major for the first time at the 2021 US Open, after defeating Kateryna Baindl, Elvina Kalieva, and Océane Dodin in the qualifying competition.

In 2022, she qualified for the Australian Open and the French Open, but lost in the first round of both. Later that year, Bucsa also qualified for her first WTA 1000 event, at the Canadian Open. At the US Open, she recorded her first win at a major by defeating Kaja Juvan, but lost to 19th seed Danielle Collins in the second round. She and Weronika Falkowska won the doubles title at the Andorrà Open, defeating Angelina Gabueva and Anastasia Zakharova in the final.

=== 2023: Top 100, major third round in singles ===
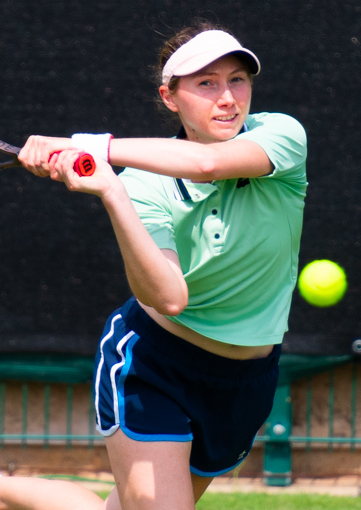
Bucșa at the 2023 Birmingham Classic

Bucșa reached the top 100 in the singles WTA rankings on 16 January 2023. She qualified for the Australian Open and reached the third round recording her first two wins at this major tournament over Eva Lys and Bianca Andreescu. She then lost to world No. 1, Iga Świątek, in the third round. This was her best result at a Grand Slam tournament thus far. At the Lyon Open, she won her first WTA Tour doubles title with Bibiane Schoofs. At the Indian Wells Open, she reached the second round of a WTA 1000 tournament for the first time in her career, defeating Katie Swan as a qualifier.

Bucșa made her main-draw debut at Wimbledon and defeated Kamilla Rakhimova for her first win at this major tournament, before losing to fourth-seeded Jessica Pegula in the second round. She and Alena Fomina-Klotz won the doubles title at the Contrexéville Open, defeating Amina Anshba and Anastasia Dețiuc in the final.

Bucșa entered the main draw of the Canadian Open as a lucky loser, but lost to Petra Martić in the first round. On her debut at the Cincinnati Open, she upset 13th seed Belinda Bencic to reach the second round. At the Guadalajara Open, she double bageled former top-ten player Kristina Mladenovic. In mid-December, she won her first WTA 125 singles title at Limoges, defeating Elsa Jacquemot in the final. She also won the doubles title there, partnering Yana Sizikova, defeating Oksana Kalashnikova and Maia Lumsden in the final.

=== 2024: Olympics bronze, Madrid title, top 20 in doubles ===
Bucșa began her season by reaching the doubles semifinal of the Brisbane International with Alexandra Panova. She qualified for the Adelaide International as a lucky loser and defeated Jasmine Paolini in the first round, before losing to top seed Elena Rybakina in the second. Following this, she reached a new career-high singles ranking of No. 56, on 15 January 2024. At the Australian Open, she reached the doubles quarterfinals with Panova. As a result, she reached the top 50 in doubles on 29 January 2024. In Abu Dhabi, she reached the quarterfinals as a lucky loser, but once again lost to top seed Rybakina. In Doha, she and partner Monica Niculescu reached the doubles quarterfinal. She then made her debut at the Dubai Championships as a lucky loser by replacing Ons Jabeur in the second round, but lost to eventual finalist Anna Kalinskaya.

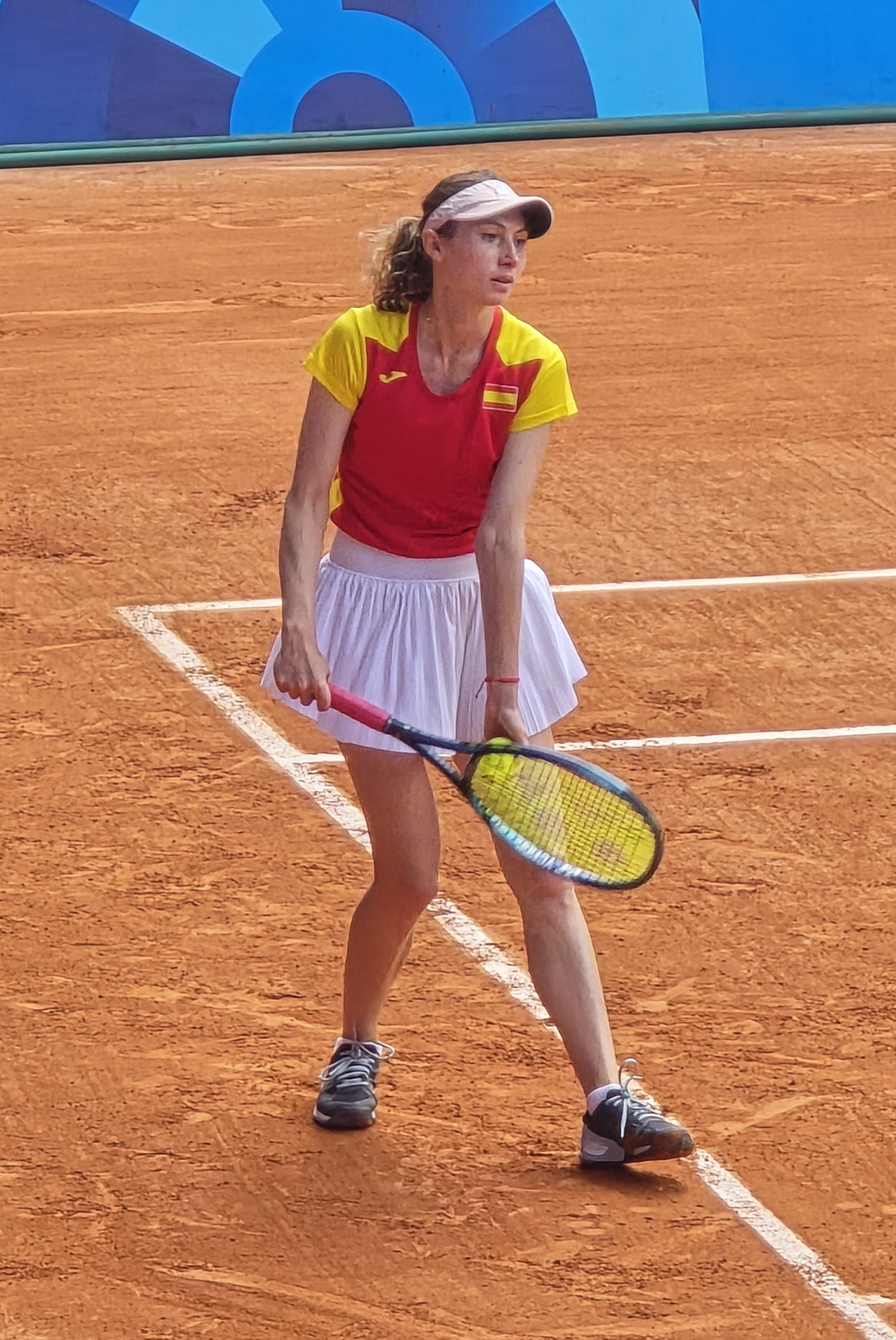
Bucșa during the bronze medal match at the 2024 Summer Olympics

Seeded fourth in singles in Bogotá, she defeated You Xiaodi and Jule Niemeier, before losing to her doubles partner Kamilla Rakhimova in the quarterfinals. She and Rakhimova later won the doubles title in Bogotá by defeating the third-seeded team of Anna Bondár and Irina Khromacheva in the final. In Madrid, Bucșa defeated Harriet Dart, before losing to 10th seed Daria Kasatkina in the second round. Seeded eighth in doubles, she and compatriot Sara Sorribes Tormo won the title defeating Barbora Krejčíková and Laura Siegemund in the final, becoming the first all-Spanish doubles team to win in Madrid. This was Bucșa's first WTA 1000 title, which brought her to a career-high doubles ranking of No. 27 on 6 May 2024. The following month, Bucșa won her first WTA 500 doubles title in Strasbourg, partnering Niculescu and defeating Asia Muhammad and Aldila Sutjiadi in the final. En route to the title, Bucșa and Niculescu upset the second-seeded team of Demi Schuurs and Luisa Stefani in the semifinal.

In May, she recorded her first French Open singles win against qualifier Yuliia Starodubtseva in the first round, before losing to Elisabetta Cocciaretto in the second. In doubles, she and Niculescu upset the 14th-seeded team of Sofia Kenin and Bethanie Mattek-Sands in the second round. Following her French Open doubles run, she achieved a career-high doubles ranking of No. 19 and surpassed Sorribes Tormo as the top Spanish female doubles player on 10 June 2024.

She made her Olympics debut in Paris, where she reached the second round in singles with a win over Petra Martić. Seeded eighth in doubles with Sorribes Tormo, they won the bronze medal. At the China Open, she reached the fourth round of a WTA 1000 tournament for the first time in her career, defeating wildcard entrant Yao Xinxin, 11th seed Liudmila Samsonova and 24th seed Elise Mertens. Her run was ended by Karolína Muchová.

For her bronze medal win, Bucsa was commemorated on the Paseo Torre de la Vega in her hometown of Torrelavega, becoming the first female and first athlete to receive the honor.

=== 2025: First singles final, WTA 1000 finalist in doubles ===
In March, Bucșa and Miyu Kato reached the doubles final of the Miami Open, but lost to Mirra Andreeva and Diana Shnaider. En route, they upset the top seeds and world No. 1 and No. 2 players, Kateřina Siniaková and Taylor Townsend.

She defended her doubles title at the Copa Colsanitas with Sara Sorribes Tormo, defeating Laura Pigossi and Irina Bara in the final.

At Wimbledon, Bucșa defeated Anca Todoni and 22nd seed Donna Vekić to reach the third round at the grass-court major for the first time, at which point her run was ended by lucky loser Solana Sierra.

Teaming with Nicole Melichar-Martinez, she won the doubles title at the Monterrey Open, overcoming Guo Hanyu and Alexandra Panova in the final. Wins over qualifier Claire Liu, Alexandra Eala and 19th seed Elise Mertens saw Bucșa make it through to the fourth round of a major for the first time at the US Open, where she lost to world No. 1 and eventual champion, Aryna Sabalenka.

In October at the Hong Kong Open, Bucșa defeated qualifier Ma Yexin and eighth seed Emiliana Arango to reach the quarterfinals, where she was given a walkover when her opponent, top seed Belinda Bencic, withdrew from the tournament due to a thigh injury. In the semifinals, she overcame fifth seed Maya Joint to make it into her first tour singles final, which she lost to third seed Victoria Mboko, in three sets. Despite her defeat, Bucșa reached a new career-high singles ranking of world No. 54 on 3 November 2025.

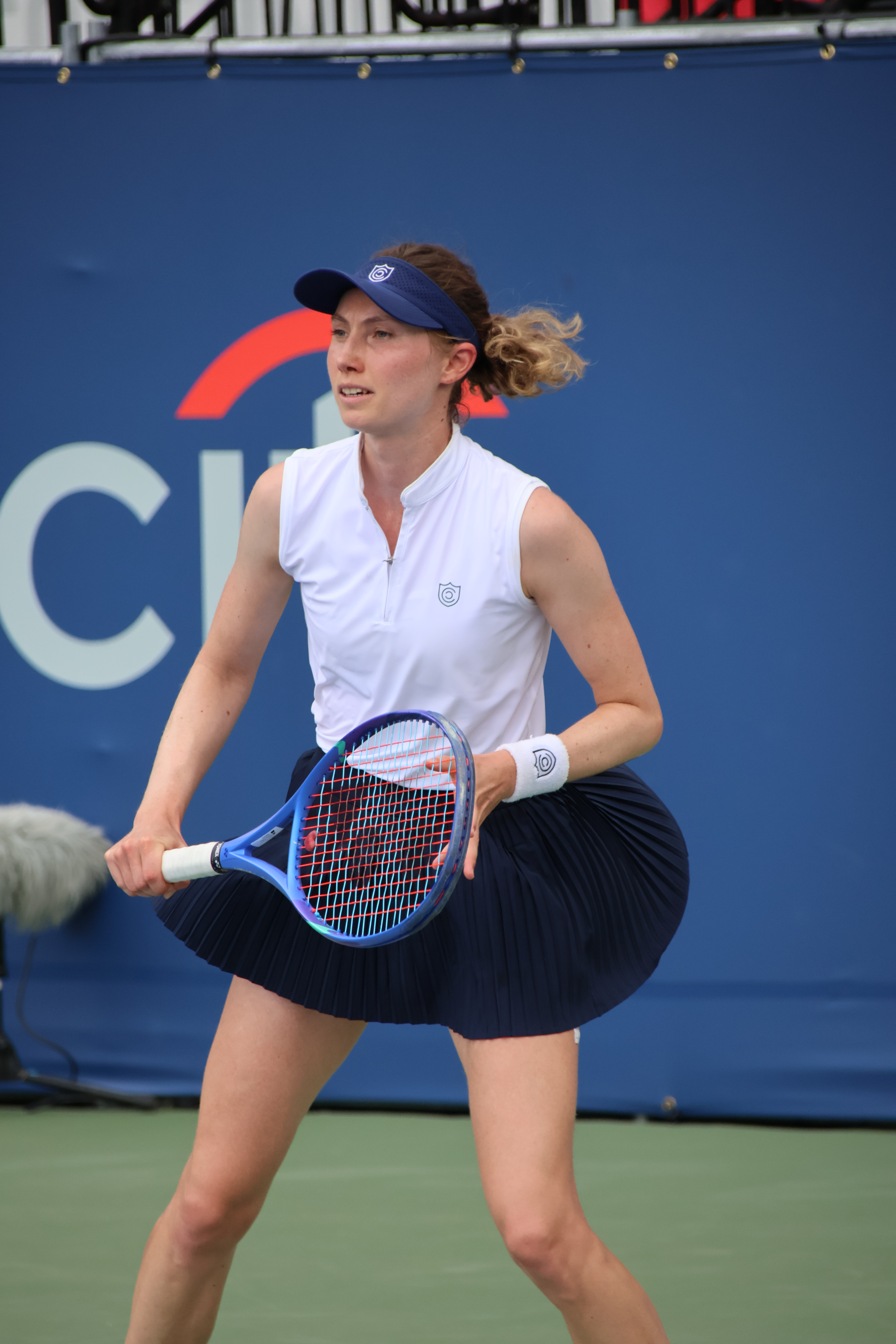
Cristina Bucșa at the 2025 Washington Open.

=== 2026: First career singles title & top-10 win, top 30, Spanish No. 1 ===
Bucșa reached the top 50 in the singles rankings on 5 January 2026.

At the Mérida Open, Bucșa recorded wins over Donna Vekić, wildcard entrant Marina Stakusic, Zeynep Sönmez and top seed Jasmine Paolini, her first top-10 win, to reach the final. Bucșa defeated Magdalena Fręch in three sets to claim her first WTA Tour singles title. Playing alongside Jiang Xinyu, she also won the doubles title at the same event, overcoming Isabelle Haverlag and Maia Lumsden in the final. As a result of this performance, Bucșa rose 32 places in the WTA singles rankings to a new career-high of world No. 31, on 2 March 2026, and to the top 30 on 16 March 2026, becoming the Spanish No. 1 player.

== Career statistics ==
=== Grand Slam performance timelines ===
Key
W	F	SF	QF	#R	RR	Q#	DNQ	A	NH

(W) winner; (F) finalist; (SF) semifinalist; (QF) quarterfinalist; (#R) rounds 4, 3, 2, 1; (RR) round-robin stage; (Q#) qualification round; (DNQ) did not qualify; (A) absent; (NH) not held; (SR) strike rate (events won / competed); (W–L) win–loss record.
To avoid confusion and double counting, these charts are updated at the conclusion of a tournament or when the player's participation has ended.

==== Singles ====
Tournament	2019	2020	2021	2022	2023	2024	2025	2026	SR	W–L	Win%
Australian Open	A	Q1	Q1	1R	3R	1R	2R	1R	0 / 5	3–5	38%
French Open	A	Q1	Q1	1R	1R	2R	1R	1R	0 / 5	1–5	17%
Wimbledon	Q2	NH	Q3	Q2	2R	2R	3R	A	0 / 3	4–3	57%
US Open	Q1	A	1R	2R	1R	1R	4R	3R	0 / 5	6–6	50%
Win–Loss	0–0	0–0	0–1	1–3	3–4	2–4	6–4	2–3	0 / 19	14–19	42%

==== Doubles ====
Tournament	2023	2024	2025	2026	SR	W–L	Win%
Australian Open	2R	QF	1R	3R	0 / 4	6–4	60%
French Open	1R	3R	1R	3R	0 / 4	4–4	50%
Wimbledon	1R	2R	1R	A	0 / 3	1–3	25%
US Open	2R	1R	3R	QF	0 / 4	6–4	60%
Win–Loss	2–4	6–4	2–4	7–3	0 / 15	17–15	53%

==== Mixed doubles ====
Tournaments	2024	2025	2026	SR	W–L
Australian Open	A	1R	A	0 / 1	0–1
French Open	1R	2R	QF	0 / 3	3–3
Wimbledon	2R	1R	A	0 / 2	1–2
US Open	2R	A	A	0 / 1	1–1
Win–Loss	2–3	1–3	2–1	0 / 7	5–7

=== Olympic medal matches ===
==== Doubles: 1 (bronze medal) ====
Result	Year	Tournament	Surface	Partner	Opponents	Score
Bronze	2024	Paris Summer Olympics	Clay	(Spain) Sara Sorribes Tormo	(Czech Republic) Karolína Muchová (Czech Republic) Linda Nosková	6–2, 6–2
