= Moldova at the 2006 Winter Olympics =

- IOC code: MDA
- NOC: National Olympic Committee of the Republic of Moldova
- Website: www.olympic.md (in Romanian)

in Turin
- Competitors: 6 (3 men, 3 women) in 3 sports
- Flag bearers: Natalia Levtchenkova (opening and closing)
- Medals: Gold 0 Silver 0 Bronze 0 Total 0

Winter Olympics appearances (overview)
- 1994; 1998; 2002; 2006; 2010; 2014; 2018; 2022; 2026

Other related appearances
- Romania (1924–1936); Soviet Union (1956–1988)

Moldova participated at the 2006 Winter Olympics in Turin, Italy held between 10 and 26 February 2006. The country's participation in the Games marked its fourth appearance at the Winter Olympics since its debut in the 1994 Games.

The Moldovan team consisted of six athletes including three women who competed across three sports. Natalia Levtchenkova served as the country's flag-bearer during the opening and closing ceremonies. Moldova did not win any medal in the Games, and has not won a Winter Olympics medal as of these Games.

== Background ==
Moldova achieved independence after the break-up of Soviet Union in 1991 and its National Olympic Committee was formed on 29 January 1991. As the National Olympic Committee of the Republic of Moldova was only recognized by the International Olympic Committee (IOC) in 1993, Moldovan athletes participated as a part of a unified team at the 1992 Summer Olympics at Barcelona. Moldavan athletes competed from 1952 to 1988 as a part of Soviet Union. The 1994 Winter Olympics marked Moldova's first participation as an independent nation in the Olympic Games. After the nation made its debut in the Winter Olympics at the 1994 Games, this edition of the Games in 2006 marked the nation's fourth appearance at the Winter Games.

The 2006 Winter Olympics was held in Turin held between 10 and 26 February 2006. The Moldovan team consisted of six athletes including three women who competed across three sports. Natalia Levtchenkova served as the country's flag-bearer during the opening and closing ceremonies. Moldova did not win any medal in the Games, and has not won a Winter Olympics medal as of these Games.

== Competitors ==
Moldova sent seven athletes who competed in three sports at the Games.

Sport	Men	Women	Total
Biathlon	1	3	4
Cross-country skiing	1	1	2
Luge	1	0	1
Total	3	3	6 (Note: Elena Gorohova competed in two sports)

== Biathlon ==
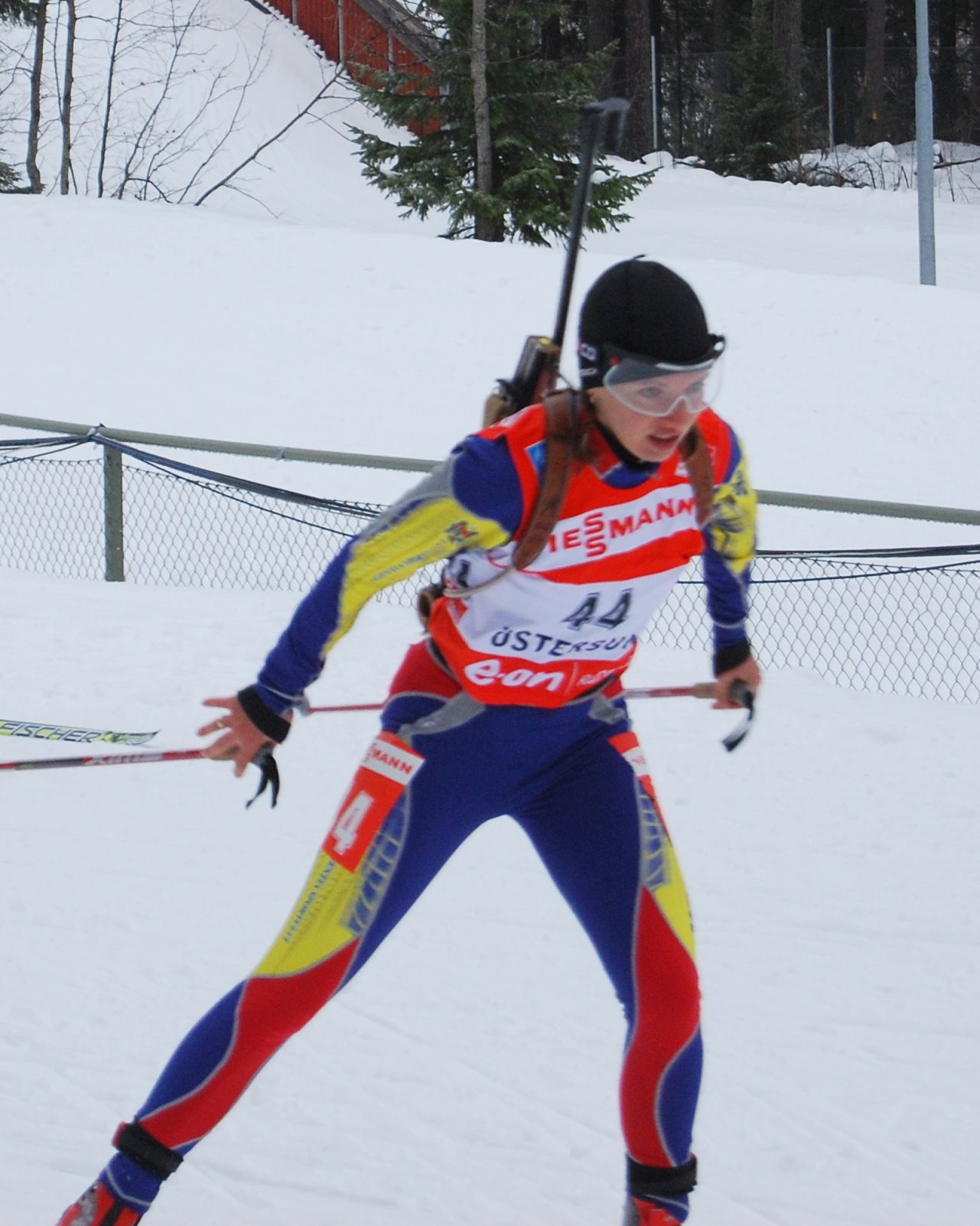
Natalia Levchenkova competed in four biathlon events

Biathlon competitions were held at the newly constructed Cesana San Sicario Arena between 11 and 25 February. This was the first time that an Olympic programme had ten medal events in the biathlon competition. Four Moldovan athletes participated across six events in biathlon. The biathlon events consisted of a skiing a specific course multiple times depending on the length of the competition, with intermediate shooting at various positions. For every shot missed, a penalty of one minute is applied in individual events, and the participant is required to ski through a penalty loop in sprint events.

In the men's events, debutante Mihail Gribusencov finished 81st in the sprint event and did not register a finish in the individual event. In the women's events, Levtchenkova, who made her debut at the Olympics, participated in all of the women's individual medal events. She is a Russian born athlete, who became a naturalized citizen of Moldova. This was the second Olympics for Valentina Ciurina, and Elena Gorohova was competing in her third Winter Games. All three women participated in the sprint event, with Natalia Levtchenkova registering the best finish in 41st amongst the 83 competitors. In the other medal events, Levtchenkova registered her best finish in the women's individual event, finishing in the top ten amongst the 82 participants.

Athlete	Event	Adjusted Time	Misses	Rank
Mihail Gribusencov	Men's sprint	32:17.6	2	81
Mihail Gribusencov	Men's individual	DNS		
Elena Gorohova	Women's sprint	26:23.9	2	68
Natalia Levtchenkova	Women's sprint	24:32.2	1	41
Valentina Ciurina	Women's sprint	30:04.2	4	81
Natalia Levtchenkova	Women's pursuit	41:36.19	2	23
Natalia Levtchenkova	Women's mass start	44:21.8	2	21
Natalia Levtchenkova	Women's individual	52:11.7	2	8

== Cross-country skiing ==
Cross-country skiing events were held at the Stadio del Trampolino in Pragelato Plan. This was the second time that sprint competitions were held in the Winter Olympics after 2002. Ilie Bria and Elena Gorohova represented the nation, and competed in the sprint events. This was Bria's debut and only participation in the Winter Olympics. Bria and Gorohova finished 77th and 62nd in the qualifying rounds of the men's and women's sprint events respectively, and did not qualify for the next round.

Athlete	Event	Qualifying		Quarterfinal		Semifinal		Final	
Athlete	Event	Total	Rank	Total	Rank	Total	Rank	Total	Rank
Ilie Bria	Men's sprint	2:42.30	77	Did not advance					77
Elena Gorohova	Women's sprint	2:31.61	62	Did not advance					62

== Luge ==
Luge events were held at Cesana Pariol on 11 and 12 February. Bogdan Macovei represented the nation, and competed in the men's event. This was Macovei's debut in the Winter Olympics, and he would go on to represent the nation in two subsequent Winter Games. In the event, Macovei was ranked second to last amongst the 36 competitors after his first run. He progressively improved his time over the next three runs to move up the leader board. In the fourth and final run, he recorded his best time of 53.599 seconds. He was classified 30th overall with a time of just over three minutes and 38 seconds, nearly 12 seconds behind the winner Armin Zöggeler of Italy.

Athlete	Event	Final					
Athlete	Event	Run 1	Run 2	Run 3	Run 4	Total	Rank
Bogdan Macovei	Men's singles	55.681	55.101	54.005	53.599	3:38.386	30
