= Biathlon at the 2022 Winter Olympics – Women's individual =

Women’s individual at the XXIV Olympic Winter Games
- Biathlon
- Venue: Hualindong Ski Resort
- Date: 7 February 2022
- Competitors: 87 from 29 nations
- Winning time: 44:12.7

Medalists
1st place, gold medalist(s)		Denise Herrmann	Germany
2nd place, silver medalist(s)		Anaïs Chevalier-Bouchet	France
3rd place, bronze medalist(s)		Marte Olsbu Røiseland	Norway

The Women's individual competition of the Beijing 2022 Olympics was held on 7 February, at the National Biathlon Centre, in the Zhangjiakou cluster of competition venues, 180 kilometres (110 mi) north of Beijing, at an elevation of 1,665 metres (5,463 ft). The Olympic champion was Denise Herrmann of Germany. Anaïs Chevalier-Bouchet of France won the silver medal, and Marte Olsbu Røiseland of Norway the bronze. For Herrmann and Chevalier-Bouchet it was the first individual Olympic medal.

== Summary ==
The defending champion was Hanna Öberg. The 2018 silver medalist, Anastasiya Kuzmina, and bronze medalist, Laura Dahlmeier, retired from competitions. The overall leader of the 2021–22 Biathlon World Cup before the Olympics was Røiseland, and the leader in the individual was Markéta Davidová who was also the defending world champion.

== Results ==
The race was started at 17:00.

Rank	Bib	Name	Country	Time	Penalties (P+S+P+S)	Deficit
1st place, gold medalist(s)	8	Denise Herrmann	Germany	44:12.7	1 (0+0+1+0)	
2nd place, silver medalist(s)	12	Anaïs Chevalier-Bouchet	France	44:22.1	1 (0+0+0+1)	+9.4
3rd place, bronze medalist(s)	1	Marte Olsbu Røiseland	Norway	44:28.0	2 (1+0+0+1)	+15.3
4	36	Vanessa Voigt	Germany	44:29.3	1 (1+0+0+0)	+16.6
5	30	Dzinara Alimbekava	Belarus	44:44.4	1 (0+0+0+1)	+31.7
6	15	Markéta Davidová	Czech Republic	44:44.6	1 (0+0+0+1)	+31.9
7	16	Deedra Irwin	United States	45:14.1	1 (0+0+0+1)	+1:01.4
8	22	Ingrid Landmark Tandrevold	Norway	45:15.4	1 (0+1+0+0)	+1:02.7
9	74	Kristina Reztsova	ROC	45:25.8	2 (0+0+2+0)	+1:13.1
10	32	Yuliia Dzhima	Ukraine	45:34.4	2 (0+1+0+1)	+1:21.7
11	21	Iryna Petrenko	Ukraine	45:42.2	0 (0+0+0+0)	+1:29.5
12	13	Mona Brorsson	Sweden	45:43.1	1 (1+0+0+0)	+1:30.4
13	28	Elvira Öberg	Sweden	45:55.2	3 (0+1+2+0)	+1:42.5
14	80	Vanessa Hinz	Germany	46:07.4	1 (0+1+0+0)	+1:54.7
15	34	Linn Persson	Sweden	46:22.3	2 (0+0+1+1)	+2:09.6
16	17	Hanna Öberg	Sweden	46:35.8	3 (0+2+0+1)	+2:23.1
17	11	Lisa Theresa Hauser	Austria	46:36.0	3 (0+1+1+1)	+2:23.3
18	4	Dorothea Wierer	Italy	46:45.0	3 (0+1+0+2)	+2:32.3
19	65	Lucie Charvátová	Czech Republic	46:46.6	2 (0+1+0+1)	+2:33.9
20	26	Monika Hojnisz-Staręga	Poland	46:55.3	2 (0+0+1+1)	+2:42.6
21	45	Julia Simon	France	47:09.1	4 (0+0+1+3)	+2:56.4
22	19	Tiril Eckhoff	Norway	47:10.2	5 (0+2+0+3)	+2:57.5
23	38	Svetlana Mironova	ROC	47:59.3	3 (0+1+1+1)	+3:46.6
24	41	Lena Häcki	Switzerland	48:03.3	4 (0+2+1+1)	+3:50.6
25	71	Franziska Preuß	Germany	48:04.2	4 (0+2+0+2)	+3:51.5
26	54	Katharina Innerhofer	Austria	48:10.0	4 (0+2+0+2)	+3:57.3
27	3	Fuyuko Tachizaki	Japan	48:17.5	3 (1+1+0+1)	+4:04.8
27	23	Jessica Jislová	Czech Republic	48:17.5	2 (0+1+0+1)	+4:04.8
29	2	Polona Klemenčič	Slovenia	48:18.8	2 (0+2+0+0)	+4:06.1
30	10	Anaïs Bescond	France	48:26.0	4 (2+1+0+1)	+4:13.3
31	20	Julia Schwaiger	Austria	48:42.2	3 (2+1+0+0)	+4:29.5
32	18	Mari Eder	Finland	48:42.9	3 (1+0+1+1)	+4:30.2
33	25	Megan Bankes	Canada	48:47.2	2 (0+0+0+2)	+4:34.5
34	50	Tereza Voborníková	Czech Republic	48:51.6	2 (0+0+1+1)	+4:38.9
35	58	Chu Yuanmeng	China	48:58.8	2 (0+0+0+2)	+4:46.1
36	43	Kamila Żuk	Poland	49:02.7	3 (0+2+1+0)	+4:50.0
37	56	Alina Stremous	Moldova	49:07.5	4 (1+2+0+1)	+4:54.8
38	53	Emilie Kalkenberg	Norway	49:08.8	4 (3+0+0+1)	+4:56.1
39	59	Clare Egan	United States	49:08.9	5 (1+0+3+1)	+4:56.2
40	24	Justine Braisaz-Bouchet	France	49:10.1	5 (0+2+2+1)	+4:57.4
41	14	Iryna Leshchanka	Belarus	49:10.3	4 (1+1+1+1)	+4:57.6
42	6	Paulína Fialková	Slovakia	49:10.7	4 (0+2+1+1)	+4:58.0
43	5	Tuuli Tomingas	Estonia	49:20.3	4 (0+1+1+2)	+5:07.6
44	44	Galina Vishnevskaya-Sheporenko	Kazakhstan	49:32.3	1 (0+1+0+0)	+5:19.6
45	51	Lotte Lie	Belgium	49:36.9	4 (1+2+0+1)	+5:24.2
46	49	Ivona Fialková	Slovakia	49:54.2	6 (0+4+1+1)	+5:41.5
47	73	Meng Fanqi	China	49:56.5	2 (0+0+0+2)	+5:43.8
48	35	Elena Kruchynkina	Belarus	49:56.8	4 (0+3+0+1)	+5:44.1
49	33	Federica Sanfilippo	Italy	50:09.3	5 (0+2+1+2)	+5:56.6
50	81	Maria Zdravkova	Bulgaria	50:13.1	1 (0+1+0+0)	+6:00.4
51	48	Nastassia Kinnunen	Finland	50:13.5	4 (0+1+2+1)	+6:00.8
52	52	Milena Todorova	Bulgaria	50:14.9	5 (0+2+0+3)	+6:02.2
53	55	Ukaleq Slettemark	Denmark	50:27.4	0 (0+0+0+0)	+6:14.7
54	27	Hanna Sola	Belarus	50:35.9	7 (3+2+1+1)	+6:23.2
55	88	Kinga Zbylut	Poland	50:54.7	3 (0+1+1+1)	+6:42.0
56	57	Natalia Ushkina	Romania	51:04.1	2 (0+1+1+0)	+6:51.4
57	83	Joanne Reid	United States	51:06.3	5 (0+3+0+2)	+6:53.6
58	9	Baiba Bendika	Latvia	51:10.3	6 (1+3+0+2)	+6:57.6
59	37	Tang Jialin	China	51:16.0	4 (1+1+1+1)	+7:03.3
60	75	Michela Carrara	Italy	51:29.1	5 (1+2+1+1)	+7:16.4
61	60	Gabrielė Leščinskaitė	Lithuania	51:39.2	4 (1+1+0+2)	+7:26.5
62	77	Selina Gasparin	Switzerland	51:43.8	7 (1+2+2+2)	+7:31.1
63	67	Susan Dunklee	United States	51:46.0	4 (1+1+0+2)	+7:33.3
64	46	Živa Klemenčič	Slovenia	51:51.6	4 (0+1+0+3)	+7:38.9
65	63	Asuka Hachisuka	Japan	51:58.0	4 (0+1+0+3)	+7:45.3
66	68	Johanna Talihärm	Estonia	51:59.5	3 (0+1+1+1)	+7:46.8
67	47	Emma Lunder	Canada	52:02.4	7 (0+2+3+2)	+7:49.7
68	78	Henrieta Horvátová	Slovakia	52:16.1	3 (0+1+1+1)	+8:03.4
69	7	Amy Baserga	Switzerland	52:25.1	5 (2+2+1+0)	+8:12.4
70	85	Emily Dickson	Canada	52:26.1	5 (2+1+0+2)	+8:13.4
71	86	Yurie Tanaka	Japan	52:26.3	4 (2+1+0+1)	+8:13.6
72	61	Alla Ghilenko	Moldova	52:28.3	2 (0+1+0+1)	+8:15.6
73	40	Ekaterina Avvakumova	South Korea	52:31.4	6 (3+0+2+1)	+8:18.7
74	39	Sari Maeda	Japan	52:45.0	7 (2+1+0+4)	+8:32.3
75	72	Anna Juppe	Austria	52:49.7	8 (1+3+1+3)	+8:37.0
76	31	Lisa Vittozzi	Italy	52:57.1	8 (5+1+2+0)	+8:44.4
77	84	Evgeniya Burtasova	ROC	53:20.3	6 (1+0+2+3)	+9:07.6
78	29	Uliana Nigmatullina	ROC	53:42.1	10 (1+2+3+4)	+9:29.4
79	42	Regina Oja	Estonia	53:53.7	7 (4+0+2+1)	+9:41.0
80	64	Sarah Beaudry	Canada	53:55.0	5 (3+1+1+0)	+9:42.3
81	82	Ding Yuhuan	China	54:14.6	5 (2+1+0+2)	+10:01.9
82	89	Susan Külm	Estonia	54:17.0	6 (2+2+1+1)	+10:04.3
83	87	Veronika Machyniaková	Slovakia	55:21.7	5 (1+2+0+2)	+11:09.0
84	70	Kim Seon-su	South Korea	56:37.5	6 (3+0+3+0)	+12:24.8
85	69	Anna Mąka	Poland	58:18.3	9 (2+2+2+3)	+14:05.6
86	76	Daniela Kadeva	Bulgaria	59:30.4	8 (4+1+2+1)	+15:17.7
	62	Valentyna Semerenko	Ukraine	DNF	(0+1+ + )	
	66	Suvi Minkkinen	Finland	Did not start		
	79	Darya Blashko	Ukraine	Did not start		
