= Biathlon Federation of the Republic of Moldova =

Moldovan association for biathlon

- Romanian: Federația de Biatlon din Republica Moldova
- Sport: Biathlon
- Category: Sports governing body
- Jurisdiction: Moldova
- Membership: International Biathlon Union
- Founded: 1993
- Headquarters: Str. Igor Vieru 9 Box 722 MD 2075
- Location: Chișinău, Moldova
- President: Dimitri Torner
- Secretary: Petru Bria

The Biathlon Federation of the Republic of Moldova (Romanian: Federația de Biatlon din Republica Moldova) is a Moldovan association for biathlon, and is a member of the International Biathlon Union.

== History ==
The Federation was established on 12 May 1993 as a public organisation – the national governing body of the biathlon sport.

In 2018–2019, the Federation enrolled naturalised Russian and Ukrainian athletes (Pavel Magazeev, Andrey Usov, Mikhail Usov, Maxim Makarov, Alina Stremous, Alena Ivanova, Alla Ghilenko), who formed the basis of the national team. This made it possible to achieve high results in 2022 when Alina Stremous won gold (in the pursuit) and silver (in the individual race) medals at the 2022 IBU Open European Championships in Großer Arbersee (Germany).

At the 2022 Winter Olympics in Beijing the Moldovan team was represented by four athletes. The highest achievement at the Olympics was Alina Stremous' 10th place in the 7.5 km sprint.

== Leadership ==
- Dimitri Torner, President (from 2020)
- Petru Bria, Secretary General (1993-2014, 2017–2023)
- Ilie Bria, Secretary General (2024 - present)

== List of presidents ==
- Valentin Ciumac (1993–2014).
- Petru Bria (2014–2017).
- Ion Florian (2017–2020)
- Dimitri Torner (2020–present)
