= Moldova at the 2002 Winter Olympics =

- IOC code: MDA
- NOC: National Olympic Committee of the Republic of Moldova
- Website: www.olympic.md (in Romanian)

in Salt Lake City
- Competitors: 5 (3 men, 2 women) in 3 sports
- Flag bearer: Ion Bucșa (cross-country skiing)
- Medals: Gold 0 Silver 0 Bronze 0 Total 0

Winter Olympics appearances (overview)
- 1994; 1998; 2002; 2006; 2010; 2014; 2018; 2022; 2026

Other related appearances
- Romania (1924–1936); Soviet Union (1956–1988)

Moldova participated at the 2002 Winter Olympics in Salt Lake City, United States, held between 8 and 24 February 2002. The country's participation in the Games marked its third appearance at the Winter Olympics since its debut in the previous Games.

The Moldovan team consisted of five athletes including two women, who competed across three sports. Skier Ion Bucșa served as the country's flag-bearer during the opening ceremony. Moldova did not win any medal in the Games, and has not won a Winter Olympics medal as of these Games.

== Background ==
Moldova achieved independence after the break-up of Soviet Union in 1991 and its National Olympic Committee was formed on 29 January 1991. As the National Olympic Committee of the Republic of Moldova was only recognized by the International Olympic Committee (IOC) in 1993, Moldovan athletes participated as a part of a unified team at the 1992 Summer Olympics at Barcelona. Moldavan athletes competed from 1952 to 1988 as a part of Soviet Union. The 1994 Winter Olympics marked Moldova's first participation as an independent nation in the Olympic Games. After the nation made its debut in the Winter Olympics at the 1994 Games, this edition of the Games in 2002 marked the nation's third appearance at the Winter Games.

The 2002 Winter Olympics was held in Salt Lake City, United States, held between 8 and 24 February 2002. The Moldovan team consisted of five athletes including two women, who competed across three sports. Skier Ion Bucșa served as the country's flag-bearer during the opening ceremony. Moldova did not win any medal in the Games, and has not won a Winter Olympics medal as of these Games.

== Competitors ==
Moldova sent five athletes including two women who competed in nine events across three sports at the Games.

Sport	Men	Women	Athletes
Biathlon	1	1	2
Cross-country skiing	1	1	2
Luge	1	0	1
Total	3	2	5

== Biathlon ==
Biathlon competitions were held at Soldier Hollow in Wasatch Mountain State Park. Mihail Gribuşencov and Valentina Ciurina represented Moldova at the sport in the men's and women's categories respectively. This was the first Winter Games for both the athletes. Gribuşencov took part in the men's sprint and individual competitions. He recorded a best place finish of 83rd in the sprint competition. Ciurina took part in three events in the women's competition, with her best finish coming in the pursuit event.

Event	Athlete	Time	Misses (Note: In the sprint and pursuit events, a penalty loop of 150 metres had to be skied per missed target.)	Adjusted Time (Note: In the individual event, a penalty of one minute is added per missed target.)	Rank
Mihail Gribuşencov	Men's sprint	30:02.2	2	—	83
Mihail Gribuşencov	Men's individual	58:58.5	7	1'05:58.5	84
Valentina Ciurina	Women's sprint	23:49.7	1	—	51
Valentina Ciurina	Women's pursuit	38:19.7	5	—	48
Valentina Ciurina	Women's individual	52:40.8	6	58:40.8	62

== Cross-country skiing ==
Cross-country skiing competitions were held at Soldier Hollow in Wasatch Mountain State Park. Ion Bucsa and Elena Gorohova represented Moldova at the sport in the men's and women's categories respectively. This was the third Winter Games for Gorohova, who made her debut at the 1994 Games. Busca first participated in the event in the 1998 Winter Olympics and made his second appearance in the event. Busca took part in the 30 km freestyle competition, and finished in 67th place. Gorohova took part in two events in the women's competition. She finished 55th in the sprint event while not finishing the freestyle event.

Athlete	Event	Qualifying		Finals	
Athlete	Event	Time	Rank	Time	Rank
Ion Bucsa	Men's 30 km freestyle	1'32:48.9	67	Did not advance	
Elena Gorohova	Women's 15 km freestyle	DNF	–	Did not advance	
Elena Gorohova	Women's sprint	3:43.82	55	Did not advance	

== Luge ==
The Luge event was held from 10 to 11 February 2002 at the Utah Olympic Park in Park City. In his first run, Liviu Cepoi clocked a time of 47.161, finishing more than two second behind the leader Armin Zöggeler. In the second run, he clocked 47.353 to be ranked 42nd amongst the 50 participants. He performed better than the previous run in the third attempt, finishing 39th with a time of 46.604. In the final run, he completed the circuit with the time of 46.825 to be ranked 40th. Cepoi was classified in the 38th position with a total time of 3:07.943 and finished more than ten seconds behind the gold medalist Zöggeler.

Athlete	Run 1		Run 2		Run 3		Run 4		Total	
Athlete	Time	Rank	Time	Rank	Time	Rank	Time	Rank	Time	Rank
Liviu Cepoi	47.161	40	47.353	42	46.604	39	46.825	40	3:07.943	38
