= Nicolae Gaiduc =

Moldavian cross-country skier (born 1996)

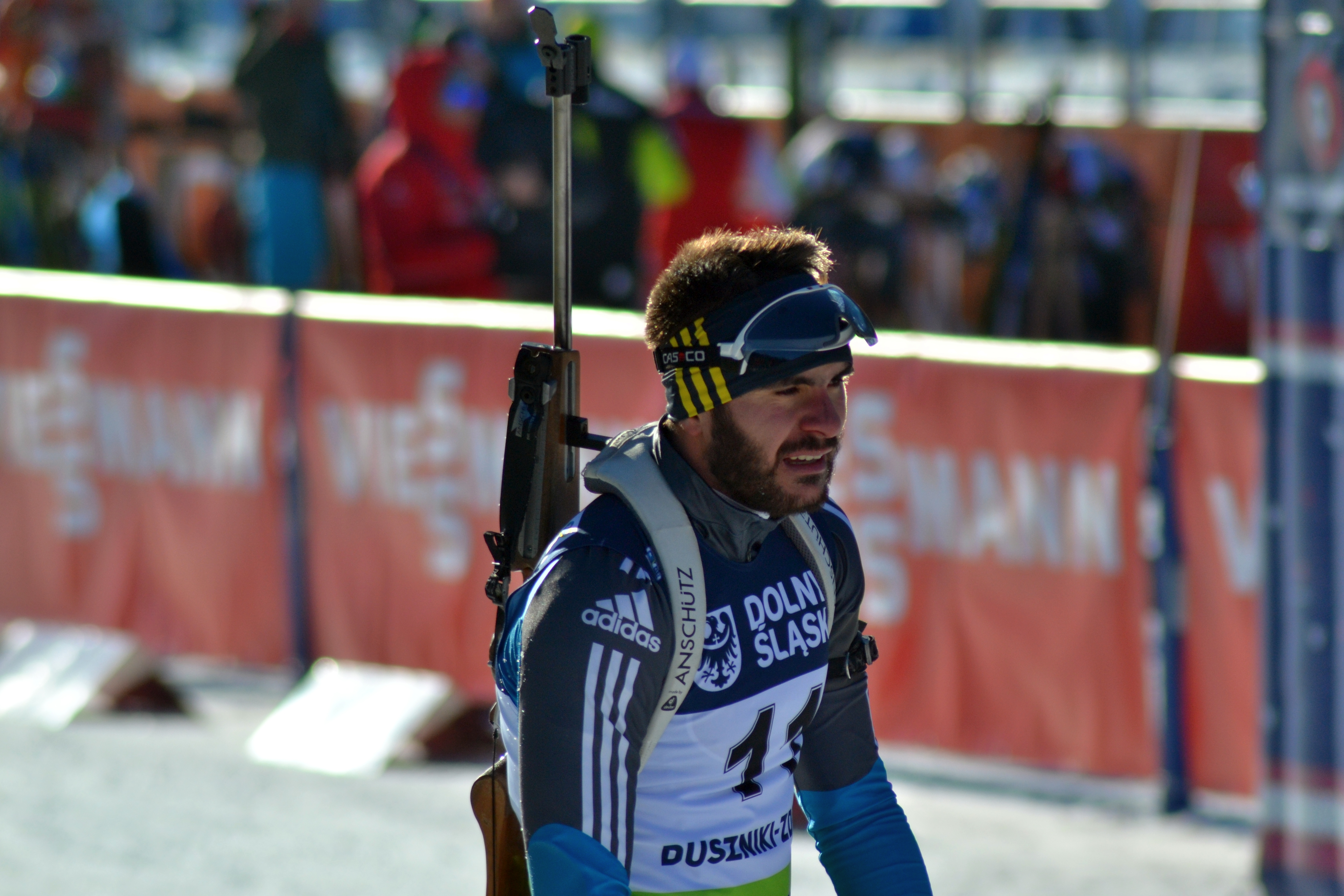

Personal information
- Nationality: Moldovan
- Born: 23 July 1996 (age 29)

Sport
- Country: Moldova
- Sport: Biathlon, Cross-country skiing

Nicolae Gaiduc (born 23 July 1996) is a Moldovan skier who competed in biathlon and cross-country skiing. He represented Moldova at the 2018 Winter Olympics. He served as his nation's flag-bearer at the Parade of Nations in the opening and closing ceremonies at the Games.

== Early life ==
Nicolae Gaiduc was born on 23 July 1996 at Ungheni in the Ungheni district of Moldova. He is affiliated with the Club Sportiv Central Dinamo at Chișinău. Gaiduc began practicing cross-country skiing at the age of 14 at the Dinamo training grounds under Nadejda Bria.

== Career ==
=== Initial years (2011-2017) ===
In 2011, Gaiduc made his international debut in the biathlon event in a tournament held in Slovakia, and secured first place in the sprint race. He made his debut in cross-country skiing at the FIS junior cross-country skiing championships held at St. Ulrich in December 2011. He finished last in the sprint race, and second to last in the freestyle race. Next year, he took part in the Balkan championship, and finished second in the Biathlon event. In the Balkan Cup skiing competitions held in February 2012, he was the second highest ranked Moldovan behind Victor Pinzaru, and achieved a credible 14th-place finish amongst the 19 competitors.

In 2013, he competed in the biathlon event at the European Youth Olympic Festival in Brașov. While he was set to participate in the FIS Nordic World Ski Championships 2013, he pulled out of the competition. In 2017, he took part in his first FIS Nordic World Ski Championships held at Lahti in Finland. He continued to participate in various international events such as the Eastern European Cup in Ukraine.

=== Olympics and after (2018–present) ===
In 2018, Gaiduc competed in the FIS cross-country ski race held at Novo Mesto in Slovenia, and achieved a 39th-place finish amongst the 49 participants. In January 2018, he participated in the Balkan cup competitions held at Ravna Gora as a prelude to the 2018 Winter Olympics.

The qualification for the cross-country event at the Winter Olympics was based on athletes achieving a minimum point score across FIS events within a specific time period. As per the final quota allocation released on 20 January 2014, Moldova was allocated one place for the distance event under the basic quota. Gaiduc served as his nation's flag-bearer at the Parade of Nations in the opening ceremony at the Games. Gaiduc made his debut at the Winter Olympics at the men's freestyle event. He was ranked 102nd amongst the 115 participants in the event. He also served as his country's flag-bearer during the closing ceremony.

After the Olympics, he represented Moldova in the FIS Nordic World Ski Championships 2019 held at Seefeld and the Alpen Cup in Ulrichen. In the 2021–22 season, Gaiduc secured top ten finishes at the roller skiing championships held in Florina and Zlatibor. In the championship event held at Veroia in September 2021, he achieved his best place finish of third in the sprint final.
