= Luge at the 2022 Winter Olympics – Qualification =

The following is about the qualification rules and the quota allocation for luge at the 2022 Winter Olympics.

== Qualification rules ==
The qualification was based on the cumulative points of the Olympic Season from 1 July 2021 to January 10, 2022. A total of 106 quota spots were available to athletes to compete at the games. A maximum 35 men, 35 women, and 18 doubles teams would initially qualify. Each NOC could enter a maximum of three men, three women, and two doubles. The host nation had the right to enter a competitor in the men's, doubles, and women's competitions provided they meet minimum standards. The team relay consisted of all nations who could form a relay team from qualified athletes.

In the men's singles, all nations with an athlete in the top 50 qualified one slot. If there were remaining spots left, the second best athlete of each nation in the top 32 was awarded an additional quota, with the third best being awarded a quota if there were any remaining spots. For the women, instead of the top 50, it was top 40, and in the doubles it was top 25, with the second sled being required to be in the top 28 (if any spots were left). Each country could enter a maximum of 10 athletes (three each in the singles events and two doubles sleds for a total of four athletes).

On December 17, 2021, the International Luge Federation announced that the qualification system was changed. The qualification system was changed due to training runs being cancelled at the first World Cup, and equipment not being delivered to the following World Cups. The new system will see athletes qualify based on their top four results during the World Cup season, (as opposed to the previous all seven results counting).

== Quota allocation ==
=== Current summary ===
Standings after all 7 races

Nations	Men's	Doubles	Women's	Relay	Athletes
Argentina			1		1
Australia	1				1
Austria	3	2	3	Yes	10
Bosnia and Herzegovina	1				1
Bulgaria	1				1
Canada	1	1	3	Yes	6
China	1	1	1	Yes	4
Chinese Taipei			1		1
Czech Republic	1	1	1	Yes	4
Georgia	1				1
Germany	3	2	3	Yes	10
Great Britain	1				1
Ireland			1		1
Italy	3	1	3	Yes	8
Japan	1				1
Latvia	3	2	3	Yes	10
Moldova			1		1
Poland	1	1	1	Yes	4
Romania	1	1	1	Yes	4
ROC	3	2	3	Yes	10
Slovakia	2	1	1	Yes	5
South Korea	1	1	1	Yes	4
Sweden	1		1		2
Switzerland			1		1
Ukraine	2	1	2	Yes	6
United States	3	1	3	Yes	8
Total: 26 NOCs	35	18	35	14	106

=== Men's ===
NOCs ranked within the top 50 on the Olympic Season World Cup Ranking List qualify one sled. If there is less than 35 qualifiers then NOCs with a second sled ranked in the top 32 may qualify. If there is still less than 35, then NOCs with a third sled ranked in the top 32 may qualify a third sled.

Number of sleds	Athletes total	Nation
3	18	Germany; Austria; ROC; Latvia; Italy; United States
2	2	Slovakia; Ukraine
1	15	Canada; Romania; Australia; Sweden; Poland; Great Britain; Bulgaria; China; Czech Republic; Bosnia and Herzegovina; Georgia; Japan; South Korea (Note: quota allocated to participate in the team relay.)
35	35	

=== Doubles ===
NOCs ranked within the top 25 on the Olympic Season World Cup Ranking List qualify one sled. If there is less than 18 qualifiers then NOCs with a second sled ranked in the top 28 may qualify.

Number of sleds	Athletes total	Nation
2	16	Germany; Latvia; Austria; ROC
1	20	Italy; Poland; Canada; United States; South Korea; Slovakia; Ukraine; Romania; Czech Republic; China (Note: China's best entry does not rank in the top 25 so would qualify as host.)
18	36	

=== Women's ===
NOCs ranked within the top 40 on the Olympic Season World Cup Ranking List qualify one sled. If there is less than 35 qualifiers then NOCs with a second sled ranked in the top 32 may qualify. If there is still less than 35, then NOCs with a third sled ranked in the top 32 may qualify a third sled.

Number of sleds	Athletes total	Nation
3	21	Germany; Austria; United States; ROC; Latvia; Italy; Canada
2	2	Ukraine
1	12	Switzerland; Romania; South Korea; Slovakia; Sweden; China; Argentina; Poland (Note: quota allocated to participate in the team relay.); Czech Republic; Chinese Taipei (Note: allocation according to rule D3.1 for sleds outside of the top 40.); ~~Netherlands~~; Moldova; Ireland
35	35	

=== Team relay ===
Criteria	Teams	Nation
Nations with sleds in all events	11	Austria; Canada; China; Germany; Italy; Latvia; Romania; ROC; Slovakia; Ukraine; United States
Nations who need an additional quota	3	Czech Republic (Note: needs one quota in women's); Poland; South Korea (Note: needs on quota in men's)
