= Moldova at the 2014 Winter Olympics =

- IOC code: MDA
- NOC: National Olympic Committee of the Republic of Moldova
- Website: www.olympic.md (in Romanian)

in Sochi
- Competitors: 4 (3 men, 1 woman) in 4 sports
- Flag bearers: Victor Pinzaru (opening and closing)
- Medals: Gold 0 Silver 0 Bronze 0 Total 0

Winter Olympics appearances (overview)
- 1994; 1998; 2002; 2006; 2010; 2014; 2018; 2022; 2026

Other related appearances
- Romania (1924–1936); Soviet Union (1956–1988)

Moldova participated at the 2014 Winter Olympics in Sochi, Russia held between 7 and 23 February 2014. The country's participation in the Games marked its sixth appearance at the Winter Olympics since its debut in the 1994 Games. The Moldovan team consisted of four athletes including one woman who competed across four sports. Victor Pinzaru served as the country's flag-bearer during the opening and closing ceremonies. Moldova did not win any medal in the Games, and has not won a Winter Olympics medal as of these Games.

== Background ==
Moldova achieved independence after the break-up of Soviet Union in 1991 and its National Olympic Committee was formed on 29 January 1991. As the National Olympic Committee of the Republic of Moldova was only recognized by the International Olympic Committee (IOC) in 1993, Moldovan athletes participated as a part of a unified team at the 1992 Summer Olympics at Barcelona. Moldavan athletes competed from 1952 to 1988 as a part of Soviet Union. The 1994 Winter Olympics marked Moldova's first participation as an independent nation in the Olympic Games. After the nation made its debut in the Winter Olympics at the 1994 Games, this edition of the Games in 2014 marked the nation's sixth appearance at the Winter Games.

The 2014 Winter Olympics was held in Sochi held between 7 and 23 February 2014. The Moldovan team consisted of four athletes including one woman who competed across four sports. Victor Pinzaru served as the country's flag-bearer during the opening and closing ceremonies. Despite being held in neighboring Russia, Moldovan president Nicolae Timofti did not attend the 2014 Winter Olympics, while not officially communication the reason. Moldova did not win any medal in the Games, and has not won a Winter Olympics medal as of these Games.

== Competitors ==
Moldova sent four athletes including one woman who competed in four sports at the Games.

Sport	Men	Women	Total
Alpine skiing	1	0	1
Biathlon	0	1	1
Cross-country skiing	1	1	2
Luge	1	0	1
Total	3	1	4 (Note: Alexandra Camenscic competed in two sports.)

== Alpine skiing ==
The qualification quotas were allocated based on athletes satisfying he criteria laid out by International Ski Federation, subject to a maximum cap per country. As per the final quota allocation released on 20 January 2014, Moldova qualified two athletes for the Games.

Despite two athletes achieving the qualification standard, only Georg Lindner took part, as naturalized Italian Mirko Deflorian withdrew from the team due to poor results. The Games marked Lindner's first and only appearance at the Winter Olympic Games. The event was held on 16 February 2014 at the Gornolyzhniy Tsenter Rosa Khutor in Krasnaya Polyana and Lindner did not finish the event.

Athlete	Event	Total	
Athlete	Event	Time	Rank
Georg Lindner	Men's super-G	DNF	

== Biathlon ==
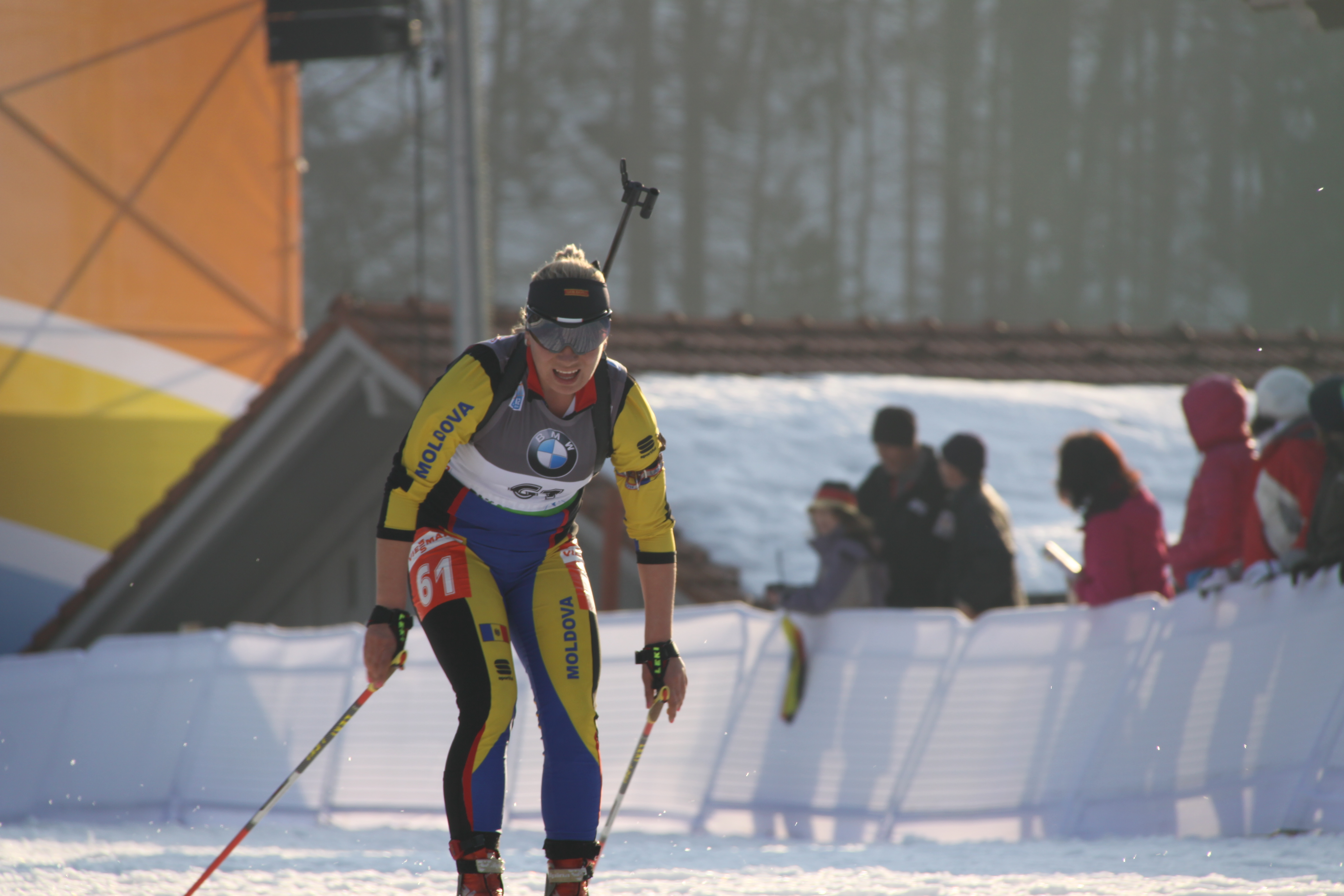
Alexandra Camenscic competed in the biathlon and cross-country skiing events.

Biathlon competitions were held at the Laura Biathlon & Ski Complex in Krasnaya Polyana from 8 to 22 February. Alexandra Camenscic was the lone athlete representing the nation. This was the second consecutive Winter Games appearance for her.

The biathlon events consisted of a skiing a specific course multiple times depending on the length of the competition, with intermediate shooting at various positions. For every shot missed, the participant is required to ski through a penalty loop in sprint event. In the women's events, Camenscic finished 83rd and last amongst the finishers in the sprint event.

Athlete	Event	Time	Misses	Rank
Alexandra Camenscic	Women's sprint	27:37.0	5	83

== Cross-country skiing ==
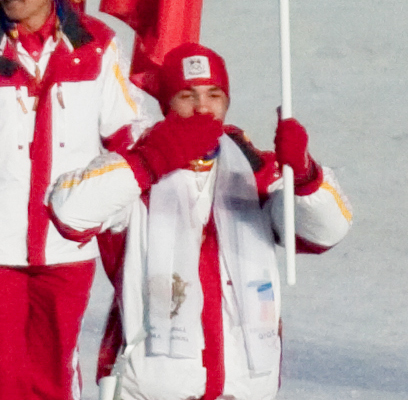
Flag-bearer Victor Pinzaru represented the nation in cross-country skiing

As per the qualification criteria, athletes with a maximum of 120 sprint points and 300 distance points as on 20 January 2014 were allowed to compete in the sprint and individual events respectively. A maximum of 20 athletes (maximum of 12 male or 12 female athletes) from a single participating NOC were allowed to compete and the remaining quotas were allocated further to athletes satisfying the standard criteria from other NOCs. According to the quota allocation released on 20 January 2014, Moldova had qualified two athletes. The team consisting of Victor Pinzaru and Alexandra Camenscic was officially named on 22 January 2014.

The main events were held at the Laura Biathlon & Ski Complex. In the men's sprint event, Pinzaru finished 77th in the qualification rounds and failed to advance to the next round. In the women's 10 km classical race, Camenscic finished more than 11 minutes behind the winner Justyna Kowalczyk and was ranked 68th amongst the 75 competitors.

Athlete	Event	Qualification		Quarterfinal		Semifinal		Final	
Athlete	Event	Time	Rank	Time	Rank	Time	Rank	Time	Rank
Victor Pinzaru	Men's sprint	4:04.91	77	Did not advance					

Athlete	Event	Time	Deficit	Rank
Alexandra Camenscic	Women's 10 km classical	39:52.6	+11:34.8	68

== Luge ==
As per the qualification criteria for luge, a maximum of 38 men were eligible for qualification. The qualification was based on the cumulative world ranking points from 1 November to 31 December 2013. The top ranked 30 athletes qualified directly and eight athletes were later added with first preference given to qualified relay teams who did not qualify individuals in all three disciplines followed by athletes from NOCs that met the minimum standards and who had not already qualified any athlete. Moldova got one of the additional quota spots, as no nations were able to use them to complete a relay. Bogdan Macovei qualified by virtue of his finish in the 2013–14 Luge World Cup, and was officially named in the contingent on 22 January 2014. This was Macovei's third consecutive appearance in the Winter Olympics, having made his debut in the 2006 Winter Games. He is a Romanian, who became a naturalized citizen of Moldova.

The event was held on 11 February 2014 at the Sliding Center Sanki. In his first run, Macovei clocked a time of 54.591 seconds, finishing more than two seconds behind the leader Albert Demchenko. In the second run, he clocked 54.271 to be ranked 35th amongst the 39 participants. In the penultimate run, he completed the circuit with a slightly better time of 53.295 to be ranked 35th. He had his best run in the final attempt, finishing 36th with a time of 53.779. He clocked a total time of 3:36.566 and was classified in the 36th position out of the 39 athletes.

Athlete	Event	Run 1		Run 2		Run 3		Run 4		Total	
Athlete	Event	Time	Rank	Time	Rank	Time	Rank	Time	Rank	Time	Rank
Bogdan Macovei	Men's singles	54.591	37	54.271	35	53.925	35	53.779	36	3:36.566	36
