= Biathlon at the 2022 Winter Olympics – Qualification =

The following is about the qualification rules and the quota allocation for the biathlon at the 2022 Winter Olympics.

== Quota allocation ==
A total quota of 210 athletes are allowed at the Games (105 both men and women). The first 93 quota allocations, per gender, will be assigned using a combination of the Nation Cup scores of their top 3 athletes in their best six sprints, one individual, three relays, one mixed relay, and one single mixed relay. These results will come during the 2020–21 Biathlon World Cup and 2021–22 Biathlon World Cups seasons, up until 16 January 2022. The final 12 spots, per gender, will be allocated using the IBU Qualifying Points List, to nations who have not qualified any athletes yet, with a maximum of two per nation.

On 16 January 2022, NOCs ranked 1-3 will qualify six athletes, 4-10 five athletes, and 11-20 four athletes, for both male and female competitions. The final twelve spots in each gender are filled individually from the IBU Qualifying points list to a maximum of two for a nation, from nations not already qualified. Two of these spots will be used by the host if not already qualified. The host may only start in the relay competitions that they have enough qualified athletes for. Reallocation of unused quotas will be from the IBU Qualifying points list for nations that have not yet qualified, or only have one qualifier. For each event a maximum of 4 athletes per NOC may compete, except the Mass Start in which it remains possible to qualify up to 6.

=== Minimum Requirements ===
During the 2020/21 or 2021/22 Biathlon World Cup season the athlete must have two results at IBU Cup, Open European Championships, World Championships or World Cup in the Sprint or Individual and have at most an IBU Qualifying point total of 150 or less. Or, two placings in the top half at the Junior World Championships. They also can have a combination of both criteria (one of each). All relay members must meet this requirement as well.

== Qualification summary ==
| Nations | Men's | Women's | Total |
|---|---|---|---|
| Austria | 5 | 5 | 10 |
| Belgium | 4 | 1 | 5 |
| Belarus | 5 | 5 | 10 |
| Bulgaria | 4 | 4 | 8 |
| Canada | 4 | 4 | 8 |
| China | 4 | 4 | 8 |
| Czech Republic | 5 | 5 | 10 |
| Denmark | 0 | 1 | 1 |
| Estonia | 4 | 4 | 8 |
| Finland | 4 | 4 | 8 |
| France | 6 | 6 | 12 |
| Germany | 6 | 5 | 11 |
| Italy | 5 | 5 | 10 |
| Japan | 2 | 4 | 6 |
| Kazakhstan | 2 | 1 | 3 |
| Latvia | 0 | 1 | 1 |
| Lithuania | 4 | 1 | 5 |
| Moldova | 2 | 2 | 4 |
| New Zealand | 1 | 0 | 1 |
| Norway | 6 | 6 | 12 |
| Poland | 1 | 4 | 5 |
| Romania | 1 | 1 | 2 |
| ROC | 5 | 5 | 10 |
| Slovakia | 4 | 4 | 8 |
| Slovenia | 4 | 2 | 6 |
| South Korea | 1 | 2 | 3 |
| Sweden | 5 | 6 | 11 |
| Switzerland | 4 | 4 | 8 |
| Ukraine | 5 | 5 | 10 |
| United States | 4 | 4 | 8 |
| Total: 30 NOCs | 107 | 105 | 212 |

== Qualification standings ==
| Qualifies 6 athletes |
| Qualifies 5 athletes |
| Qualifies 4 athletes |
| Qualifies 2 athletes by IBU qualifying points |
| Qualifies 1 athlete by IBU qualifying points |

Standings after all 37 events.

Men's standings
| Position | Country | Nations Cup Points |
|---|---|---|
| 1 | Norway | 4832 |
| 2 | France | 4632 |
| 3 | Germany | 4392 |
| 4 | ROC | 4343 |
| 5 | Sweden | 4338 |
| 6 | Italy | 3889 |
| 7 | Belarus | 3811 |
| 8 | Austria | 3740 |
| 9 | Ukraine | 3734 |
| 10 | Czech Republic | 3359 |
| 11 | Slovenia | 3251 |
| 12 | Canada | 3184 |
| 13 | Switzerland | 3123 |
| 14 | United States | 3066 |
| 15 | Finland | 3061 |
| 16 | Lithuania | 2574 |
| 17 | Bulgaria | 2417 |
| 18 | Belgium | 2415 |
| 19 | Estonia | 2285 |
| 20 | Slovakia | 2268 |
| 21 | Japan | 2181 |
| 22 | Latvia | 1980 |
| 23 | Romania | 1869 |
| 24 | Poland | 1864 |
| 25 | Kazakhstan | 1740 |
| 26 | China (Note: China receives one male quota via the IBU Qualifying Points list and one by status as host. China receives 2 additional male quotas for having athletes meeting the minimum requirement criteria.) | 1515 |
| 27 | Moldova | 1498 |
| 28 | South Korea | 766 |
| 29 | Croatia | 585 |
| 30 | New Zealand | 494 |
| 31 | Serbia | 396 |
| 32 | Greece | 281 |
| 33 | Mongolia | 58 |
| 34 | Spain | 48 |
| 35 | Great Britain | 46 |
| 36 | Hungary | 36 |
| 37 | North Macedonia | 13 |

Standings after all 37 events

Women's standings
| Position | Country | Nations Cup Points |
|---|---|---|
| 1 | Sweden | 4642 |
| 2 | Norway | 4600 |
| 3 | France | 4468 |
| 4 | Germany | 4291 |
| 5 | Belarus | 4275 |
| 6 | ROC | 4234 |
| 7 | Ukraine | 3930 |
| 8 | Austria | 3807 |
| 9 | Italy | 3805 |
| 10 | Czech Republic | 3531 |
| 11 | Switzerland | 3451 |
| 12 | United States | 3123 |
| 13 | Poland | 2940 |
| 14 | Canada | 2887 |
| 15 | Finland | 2845 |
| 16 | Estonia | 2797 |
| 17 | China | 2417 |
| 18 | Slovakia | 2332 |
| 19 | Japan | 2278 |
| 20 | Bulgaria | 2178 |
| 21 | Kazakhstan | 2136 |
| 22 | Slovenia | 1882 |
| 23 | South Korea | 1869 |
| 24 | Latvia | 1559 |
| 25 | Moldova | 1375 |
| 26 | Romania | 1364 |
| 27 | Lithuania | 1160 |
| 28 | Belgium | 1065 |
| 29 | Great Britain | 427 |
| 30 | Croatia | 337 |
| 31 | Denmark (Note: Athletes from Greenland qualify for Denmark.) | 324 |
| 32 | Australia | 171 |

=== IBU Qualifying points ===
As of 17 January 2021.

Men's standings
| Position | Country | Points |
|---|---|---|
| 1 | South Korea | 39.99 |
| 2 | Moldova | 44.02 |
| 3 | New Zealand | 44.94 |
| 4 | China | 46.66 |
| 5 | Japan | 47.37 |
| 6 | Kazakhstan | 49.31 |
| 7 | Moldova | 50.85 |
| 8 | Romania | 54.87 |
| 9 | Japan | 56.54 |
| 10 | Poland | 58.53 |
| 11 | Kazakhstan | 58.65 |
| 12 | Croatia | 59.59 |
| 13 | Romania | 63.9 |
| 14 | Latvia | 69.77 |
| 15 | Serbia | 72.59 |
| 16 | Poland | 72.63 |
| 17 | China | 74.67 |
| 18 | Latvia | 75.74 |
| 19 | South Korea | 81.69 |

Women's standings
| Position | Country | Points |
|---|---|---|
| 1 | Latvia | 34.66 |
| 2 | Moldova | 43.66 |
| 3 | Belgium | 48.33 |
| 4 | Kazakhstan | 53.22 |
| 5 | Slovenia | 57.14 |
| 6 | Slovenia | 57.38 |
| 7 | South Korea | 58.19 |
| 8 | Denmark | 61.68 |
| 9 | Moldova | 63.23 |
| 10 | Romania | 65.5 |
| 11 | Lithuania | 65.69 |
| 12 | South Korea | 66.58 |
| 13 | Lithuania | 68.09 |
| 14 | Kazakhstan | 69.83 |
| 15 | Great Britain | 72.72 |
| 16 | Latvia | 77.95 |
| 17 | Romania | 81.22 |
| 18 | Australia | 120.73 |
| 19 | Croatia | 122.58 |
| 20 | Belgium | 130.28 |
| 21 | Australia | 136.68 |
