= Biathlon at the 2022 Winter Olympics – Women's sprint =

Women’s sprint at the XXIV Olympic Winter Games
- Biathlon
- Venue: Hualindong Ski Resort
- Date: 11 February 2022
- Competitors: 89 from 29 nations
- Winning time: 20:44.3

Medalists
1st place, gold medalist(s)		Marte Olsbu Røiseland	Norway
2nd place, silver medalist(s)		Elvira Öberg	Sweden
3rd place, bronze medalist(s)		Dorothea Wierer	Italy

The Women's sprint competition of the Beijing 2022 Olympics was held on 11 February, at the National Biathlon Centre, in the Zhangjiakou cluster of competition venues, 180 kilometres (110 mi) north of Beijing, at an elevation of 1,665 metres (5,463 ft). The event was won by Marte Olsbu Røiseland of Norway, who was the 2018 silver medalist in sprint. This was her first individual Olympic gold medal. Elvira Öberg of Sweden won silver, her first Olympic medal, and Dorothea Wierer of Italy bronze, her first individual Olympic medal.

== Summary ==
The 2018 champion, Laura Dahlmeier, and the bronze medalist, Veronika Vítková, retired from competitions. Røiseland was the overall leader of the 2021–22 Biathlon World Cup as well as the leader in the sprint before the Olympics.

== Results ==
The race was started at 17:00.

Rank	Bib	Name	Country	Time	Penalties (P+S)	Deficit
1st place, gold medalist(s)	5	Marte Olsbu Røiseland	Norway	20:44.3	0 (0+0)	
2nd place, silver medalist(s)	45	Elvira Öberg	Sweden	21:15.2	0 (0+0)	+30.9
3rd place, bronze medalist(s)	22	Dorothea Wierer	Italy	21:21.5	0 (0+0)	+37.2
4	33	Lisa Theresa Hauser	Austria	21:31.6	0 (0+0)	+47.3
5	30	Ingrid Landmark Tandrevold	Norway	21:44.5	0 (0+0)	+1:00.2
6	7	Kristina Reztsova	ROC	21:49.3	2 (1+1)	+1:05.0
7	35	Anna Magnusson	Sweden	21:50.2	0 (0+0)	+1:05.9
8	57	Yuliia Dzhima	Ukraine	21:51.8	1 (0+1)	+1:07.5
9	55	Anaïs Bescond	France	21:53.1	1 (1+0)	+1:08.8
10	4	Alina Stremous	Moldova	21:59.5	0 (0+0)	+1:15.2
11	1	Tiril Eckhoff	Norway	22:00.4	2 (1+1)	+1:16.1
12	49	Linn Persson	Sweden	22:03.9	1 (0+1)	+1:19.6
13	36	Uliana Nigmatullina	ROC	22:11.8	2 (2+0)	+1:27.5
14	18	Paulína Fialková	Slovakia	22:12.0	1 (0+1)	+1:27.7
15	24	Dzinara Alimbekava	Belarus	22:12.8	1 (0+1)	+1:28.5
16	27	Monika Hojnisz-Staręga	Poland	22:12.9	1 (1+0)	+1:28.6
17	6	Milena Todorova	Bulgaria	22:15.4	1 (1+0)	+1:31.1
18	38	Vanessa Voigt	Germany	22:15.7	0 (0+0)	+1:31.4
19	52	Hanna Öberg	Sweden	22:19.1	3 (1+2)	+1:34.8
20	43	Irina Kazakevich	ROC	22:23.7	1 (0+1)	+1:39.4
21	3	Katharina Innerhofer	Austria	22:26.4	2 (0+2)	+1:42.1
22	9	Denise Herrmann	Germany	22:29.4	2 (1+1)	+1:45.1
23	40	Lena Häcki	Switzerland	22:30.3	2 (1+1)	+1:46.0
24	70	Anastasiya Merkushyna	Ukraine	22:31.6	1 (1+0)	+1:47.3
25	56	Lucie Charvátová	Czech Republic	22:35.6	1 (0+1)	+1:51.3
26	16	Hanna Sola	Belarus	22:36.4	4 (1+3)	+1:52.1
27	65	Susan Dunklee	United States	22:39.5	0 (0+0)	+1:55.2
28	8	Mari Eder	Finland	22:39.8	2 (0+2)	+1:55.5
29	28	Julia Simon	France	22:40.3	3 (1+2)	+1:56.0
30	73	Franziska Preuß	Germany	22:41.4	2 (0+2)	+1:57.1
31	26	Jessica Jislová	Czech Republic	22:42.7	1 (1+0)	+1:58.4
32	47	Emma Lunder	Canada	22:47.6	1 (0+1)	+2:03.3
33	29	Tuuli Tomingas	Estonia	22:49.2	2 (1+1)	+2:04.9
34	81	Joanne Reid	United States	22:54.9	2 (0+2)	+2:10.6
35	44	Tang Jialin	China	23:03.5	1 (1+0)	+2:19.2
36	25	Lisa Vittozzi	Italy	23:09.1	4 (4+0)	+2:24.8
37	60	Deedra Irwin	United States	23:10.1	2 (0+2)	+2:25.8
38	59	Ida Lien	Norway	23:10.3	4 (1+3)	+2:26.0
39	21	Fuyuko Tachizaki	Japan	23:10.8	1 (0+1)	+2:26.5
40	15	Iryna Petrenko	Ukraine	23:11.7	2 (2+0)	+2:27.4
41	19	Markéta Davidová	Czech Republic	23:11.8	4 (2+2)	+2:27.5
41	37	Ivona Fialková	Slovakia	23:11.8	4 (1+3)	+2:27.5
43	63	Johanna Talihärm	Estonia	23:13.3	0 (0+0)	+2:29.0
44	87	Susan Külm	Estonia	23:15.3	1 (0+1)	+2:31.0
45	79	Julia Schwaiger	Austria	23:16.2	2 (1+1)	+2:31.9
46	10	Clare Egan	United States	23:16.4	3 (1+2)	+2:32.1
47	67	Svetlana Mironova	ROC	23:17.6	3 (0+3)	+2:33.3
48	2	Justine Braisaz-Bouchet	France	23:18.4	3 (1+2)	+2:34.1
49	31	Ekaterina Avvakumova	South Korea	23:19.4	2 (2+0)	+2:35.1
50	62	Baiba Bendika	Latvia	23:20.7	3 (1+2)	+2:36.4
51	58	Suvi Minkkinen	Finland	23:21.7	1 (0+1)	+2:37.4
52	12	Galina Vishnevskaya-Sheporenko	Kazakhstan	23:22.6	1 (1+0)	+2:38.3
53	41	Kamila Żuk	Poland	23:22.9	1 (1+0)	+2:38.6
54	17	Amy Baserga	Switzerland	23:24.2	2 (2+0)	+2:39.9
55	83	Vanessa Hinz	Germany	23:24.3	3 (1+2)	+2:40.0
56	77	Regina Oja	Estonia	23:24.4	2 (1+1)	+2:40.1
57	78	Samuela Comola	Italy	23:30.7	1 (1+0)	+2:46.4
58	68	Tereza Voborníková	Czech Republic	23:30.9	2 (2+0)	+2:46.6
59	23	Polona Klemenčič	Slovenia	23:31.2	2 (1+1)	+2:46.9
60	14	Iryna Leshchanka	Belarus	23:32.5	3 (2+1)	+2:48.2
61	46	Chu Yuanmeng	China	23:32.6	2 (1+1)	+2:48.3
62	64	Meng Fanqi	China	23:33.7	1 (1+0)	+2:49.4
63	53	Gabrielė Leščinskaitė	Lithuania	23:37.1	0 (0+0)	+2:52.8
64	11	Lotte Lie	Belgium	23:41.1	3 (3+0)	+2:56.8
65	34	Ukaleq Slettemark	Denmark	23:54.6	0 (0+0)	+3:10.3
66	89	Anna Mąka	Poland	23:55.4	3 (1+2)	+3:11.1
67	50	Sari Maeda	Japan	23:58.9	3 (1+2)	+3:14.6
68	13	Anaïs Chevalier-Bouchet	France	24:02.0	4 (1+3)	+3:17.7
69	75	Kinga Zbylut	Poland	24:05.1	2 (1+1)	+3:20.8
70	71	Elena Kruchynkina	Belarus	24:10.1	4 (1+3)	+3:25.8
71	32	Natalia Ushkina	Romania	24:14.3	2 (1+1)	+3:30.0
72	76	Henrieta Horvátová	Slovakia	24:20.7	1 (1+0)	+3:36.4
73	82	Erika Jänkä	Finland	24:20.9	0 (0+0)	+3:36.6
74	85	Yurie Tanaka	Japan	24:21.5	1 (0+1)	+3:37.2
75	69	Nastassia Kinnunen	Finland	24:30.0	3 (1+2)	+3:45.7
76	88	Ding Yuhuan	China	24:33.1	2 (1+1)	+3:48.8
77	20	Megan Bankes	Canada	24:35.4	3 (1+2)	+3:51.1
78	66	Maria Zdravkova	Bulgaria	24:39.1	1 (0+1)	+3:54.8
79	54	Živa Klemenčič	Slovenia	24:43.6	3 (3+0)	+3:59.3
80	80	Sarah Beaudry	Canada	24:45.9	2 (1+1)	+4:01.6
81	72	Emily Dickson	Canada	24:50.3	3 (2+1)	+4:06.0
82	39	Federica Sanfilippo	Italy	24:57.1	5 (3+2)	+4:12.8
83	42	Kim Seon-su	South Korea	25:18.2	1 (1+0)	+4:33.9
84	86	Daniela Kadeva	Bulgaria	25:26.4	1 (1+0)	+4:42.1
85	48	Dunja Zdouc	Austria	25:32.1	2 (0+2)	+4:47.8
86	51	Alla Ghilenko	Moldova	26:04.6	4 (2+2)	+5:20.3
87	74	Asuka Hachisuka	Japan	26:06.7	4 (4+0)	+5:22.4
88	84	Veronika Machyniaková	Slovakia	26:13.2	3 (2+1)	+5:28.9
89	61	Lora Hristova	Bulgaria	26:27.7	4 (3+1)	+5:43.4
