= Moldova at the 1998 Winter Olympics =

- IOC code: MDA
- NOC: National Olympic Committee of the Republic of Moldova
- Website: www.olympic.md (in Romanian)

in Nagano
- Competitors: 2 (1 man, 1 woman) in 1 sport
- Flag bearer: Ion Bucșa
- Medals: Gold 0 Silver 0 Bronze 0 Total 0

Winter Olympics appearances (overview)
- 1994; 1998; 2002; 2006; 2010; 2014; 2018; 2022; 2026

Other related appearances
- Romania (1924–1936); Soviet Union (1956–1988)

Moldova was represented at the 1998 Winter Olympics in Nagano, Japan by the National Olympic Committee of the Republic of Moldova.

In total, two athletes including one man and one woman represented Moldova in the biathlon.

== Competitors ==
In total, two athletes – Ion Bucșa and Elena Gorohova – represented Moldova at the 1998 Winter Olympics in Nagano, Japan. They competed in the biathlon events enter the men's sprint and individual and the women's sprint and individual respectively.

Sport	Men	Women	Total
Biathlon	1	1	2
Total	1	1	2

== Biathlon ==
Two Moldovan athlete participated in the biathlon events – Ion Bucșa in the men's individual and the sprint and Elena Gorohova in the women's individual and the sprint.

The biathlon events were held at the Nozawa Onsen Snow Resort in Nozawaonsen, Nagano Prefecture, Japan from 9 to 21 February 1998.

The women's individual took place on 9 February 1998 at 1 pm. Gorohova completed the course in one hour 18.1 seconds but with nine shooting miss for an adjusted time of one hour nine minutes 18.1 seconds to finish 62nd overall.

The men's individual took place on 11 February 1998 at 1 pm. Bucșa completed the course in one hour five minutes 27.5 seconds but with six shooting misses for an adjusted time of one hour 11 minutes 27.5 seconds to finish 70th overall.

The women's sprint took place on 15 February 1998 at 1 pm. Gorohova completed the course in 28 minutes 21.5 seconds with five shooting misses to finish 62nd overall.

The men's sprint took place on 18 February 1998 at 12:15 pm. Bucșa completed the course in 36 minutes 33.8 seconds with six shooting misses to finish 71st overall.

Men

Event	Athlete	Misses ^{1}	Time	Rank
10 km Sprint	Ion Bucșa	6	36:33.8	71

Event	Athlete	Time	Misses	Adjusted time ^{2}	Rank
20 km	Ion Bucșa	1'05:27.5	6	1'11:27.5	70

Women

Event	Athlete	Misses ^{1}	Time	Rank
7.5 km Sprint	Elena Gorohova	5	28:21.5	62

Event	Athlete	Time	Misses	Adjusted time ^{2}	Rank
15 km	Elena Gorohova	1'00:18.1	9	1'09:18.1	62

^{1} A penalty loop of 150 metres had to be skied per missed target.
^{2} One minute added per missed target.
