= Moldova at the 2018 Winter Olympics =

- Flag of Moldova
- IOC code: MDA
- NOC: National Olympic Committee of the Republic of Moldova
- Website: www.olympic.md (in Romanian)

in Pyeongchang, South Korea 9–25 February 2018
- Competitors: 2 (2 men) in 2 sports
- Flag bearer: Nicolae Gaiduc
- Medals: Gold 0 Silver 0 Bronze 0 Total 0

Winter Olympics appearances (overview)
- 1994; 1998; 2002; 2006; 2010; 2014; 2018; 2022; 2026

Other related appearances
- Romania (1924–1936); Soviet Union (1956–1988)

Moldova participated at the 2018 Winter Olympics in Pyeongchang, South Korea held between 9 and 25 February 2018. The country's participation in the Games marked its seventh appearance at the Winter Olympics since its debut in the 1994 Games.

The Moldovan team consisted of two athletes who competed across two sports. Skier Nicolae Gaiduc served as the country's flag-bearer during the opening ceremony. Moldova did not win any medal in the Games, and has not won a Winter Olympics medal as of these Games.

== Background ==
Moldova achieved independence after the break-up of Soviet Union in 1991 and its National Olympic Committee was formed on 29 January 1991. As the National Olympic Committee of the Republic of Moldova was only recognized by the International Olympic Committee (IOC) in 1993, Moldovan athletes participated as a part of a unified team at the 1992 Summer Olympics at Barcelona. Moldavan athletes competed from 1952 to 1988 as a part of Soviet Union. The 1994 Winter Olympics marked Moldova's first participation as an independent nation in the Olympic Games. After the nation made its debut in the Winter Olympics at the 1994 Games, this edition of the Games in 2018 marked the nation's seventh appearance at the Winter Games.

The 2018 Winter Olympics was held in Pyeongchang held between 9 and 25 February 2018. The Moldovan team consisted of five athletes including two women, who competed across three sports. Skier Nicolae Gaiduc served as the country's flag-bearer during the opening ceremony. Moldova did not win any medal in the Games, and has not won a Winter Olympics medal as of these Games.

== Competitors ==
Moldova sent two athletes who competed in two sports at the Games.

Sport	Men	Women	Total
Alpine skiing	1	0	1
Cross-country skiing	1	0	1
Total	2	0	2

== Alpine skiing ==
Moldova qualified one male athlete for the alpine skiing events. Hörl is an Austrian born skier, who switched to Moldova in 2015, because of his limited chances of making the Austrian team. Due to the nationality switch, he had to wait till the middle of 2017 to compete in the International Ski Federation events for Moldova.

The Alpine skiing events were held at the Jeongseon Alpine Centre in Bukpyeong. The course for the events was designed by former Olympic champion Bernhard Russi. The weather was cold and windy during the events, and it was the coldest since the 1994 Winter Olympics at Lillehammer. In the men's downhill event, Hörl crossed the 2,965 m (9,728 ft) course in just over one minute and 45 seconds to be ranked 40th amongst the 55 competitors. In the men's combined event, he did not register a finish.

Athlete	Event	Run 1		Run 2		Total	
Athlete	Event	Time	Rank	Time	Rank	Time	Rank
Christopher Hörl	Men's combined	1:22.25	41	DNS		DNF	
Christopher Hörl	Men's downhill	—				1:45.21	40

== Cross-country skiing ==
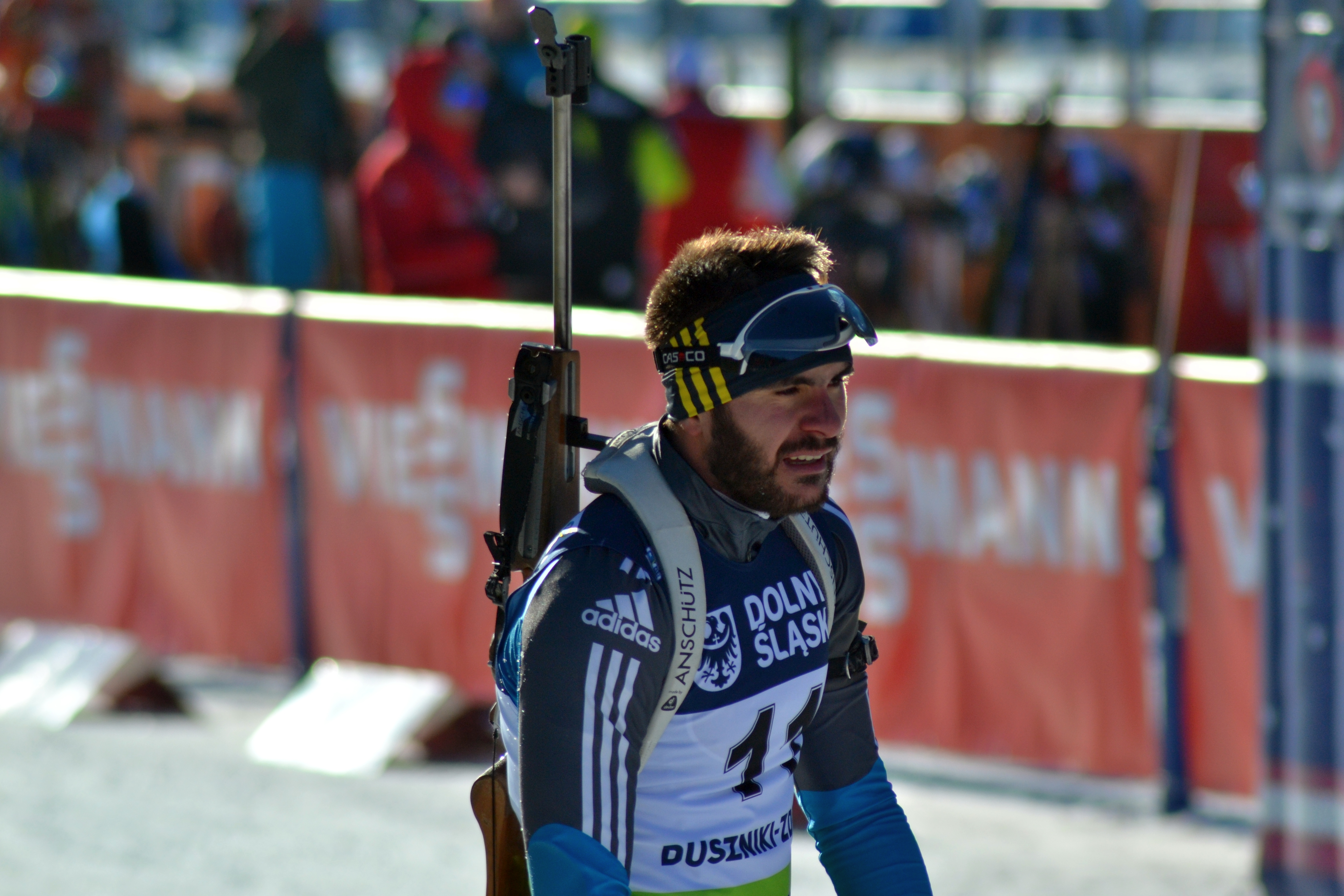
Nicolae Gaiduc represented Moldova in the cross-country event

As per the standards laid down by the International Ski Federation, athletes with a maximum of 300 points in the stipulated period were allowed to compete in the distance event. Moldova qualified one male athlete for the cross-country event. Flag-bearer Nicolae Gaiduc made his debut at the Winter Olympics at the men's freestyle event.

The main event was held on 16 February 2018 at the Alpensia Cross-Country Skiing Centre. Gaiduc completed the 15 km (9.3 mi) course in 43:43.3. He finished the race in 106nd position (out of 119 competitors), more than nine minutes behind the winner, Dario Cologna of Switzerland. (Note: Gaiduc finished 107th amongst those who had completed the course. He was classified in 102nd after five athletes were disqualified later.)

Athlete	Event	Final		
Athlete	Event	Time	Deficit	Rank
Nicolae Gaiduc	Men's 15 km freestyle	43:43.3	+9:59.4	102

== See also ==
- Moldova at the 2018 Summer Youth Olympics
