= Georg Lindner =

Moldovan alpine skier (born 1983)

Personal information
- Born: 20 January 1983 (age 43) Austria
Medal record
Alpine skiing
Representing Moldova

Georg Lindner (born 20 January 1983 in Austria) is an alpine skier from Austria but now competes for Moldova. He competed for Moldova at the 2014 Winter Olympics in the super-G event where he did not finish the race.

Although born in Austria, Lindner elected to compete for Moldova from 2009, as a naturalized Moldovan citizen.
