= Elena Gorohova =

Moldovan biathlete (born 1972)

Personal information
- Nationality: Moldovan
- Born: 6 November 1972 (age 52); Bălți, Moldova

Sport
- Sport: Biathlon; Cross-country skiing

Elena Gorohova (born 6 November 1972) is a Moldovan athlete who competes in biathlon and cross-country skiing. She represented Moldova at four Winter Olympics from 1994 to 2006. She was the first woman athlete to compete for Moldova at the Winter Olympics.

== Early life ==
Elena Gorohova was born on 6 November 1972 at Bălți in Moldova.

== Career ==
Gorohova competed in biathlon and cross-country skiing events for Moldova in 1993. She was named to the Moldovan team for the 1994 Winter Olympics held at Lillehammer. This was her debut at the Winter Olympics. She also became the first woman athlete to represent Moldova at the Winter Olympics. She competed in the women's biathlon events. She registered last place finishes in both the 7.5 km sprint and 15 km individual events.

In 1998, she was named to the Moldovan team for the second consecutive Olympics. She finished in 62nd position amongst the 64 competitors in both the 7.5 km sprint and 15 km individual events. In 2001, she took part in the sprint event in the FIS Nordic World Ski Championships and finished 27th amongst the 32 participants. In February 2002, she was named to the Moldovan team for the 2002 Winter Olympics. This was the first time, she competed in the cross-country event at the Olympics. She finished 55th in the sprint event while not finishing the freestyle event.

Gorohova took part in the sprint event in the FIS Nordic World Ski Championships 2005. In 2006, she was named to the Moldovan team for the Winter Olympics for the fourth time. She competed in both biathlon and cross-country events in a single Olympics for the first time. She finished 62nd in the qualifying rounds of the women's sprint event in cross-country skiing and did not qualify for the next round. In the biathlon sprint event, she finished 68th amongst the 83 participants.
