= Moldova at the 1994 Winter Olympics =

- IOC code: MDA (MLD used at these Games)
- NOC: National Olympic Committee of the Republic of Moldova
- Website: www.olympic.md (in Romanian)

in Lillehammer
- Competitors: 2 (1 man, 1 woman) in 1 sport
- Flag bearer: Vasily Gherghy
- Medals: Gold 0 Silver 0 Bronze 0 Total 0

Winter Olympics appearances (overview)
- 1994; 1998; 2002; 2006; 2010; 2014; 2018; 2022; 2026

Other related appearances
- Romania (1924–1936); Soviet Union (1956–1988)

Moldova participated at the 1994 Winter Olympics held between 12 and 27 February 1994 in Lillehammer, Norway. The country's participation in the Games marked its debut at the Winter Olympics and the first Olympic participation as an independent nation. The Moldovan team consisted of two athletes who competed in the biathlon event. Vasily Gherghy served as the country's flag-bearer during the opening ceremony. Moldova did not win any medals in the Games.

== Background ==
Moldova achieved independence after the break-up of Soviet Union in 1991 and its National Olympic Committee was formed on 29 January 1991. As the National Olympic Committee of the Republic of Moldova was only recognized by the International Olympic Committee (IOC) in 1993, Moldovan athletes participated as a part of a unified team at the 1992 Summer Olympics and did not participate in the 1992 Winter Olympics. Moldavan athletes competed from 1952 to 1988 as a part of Soviet Union. The 1994 Winter Olympics marked Moldova's first participation as an independent nation in the Olympic Games.

The 1994 Winter Olympics was held between 12 and 27 February 1994 in Lillehammer, Norway. The Moldovan team consisted of two athletes who competed in a single sport. Vasily Gherghy served as the country's flag-bearer during the opening ceremony. The country did not win any medals in the Games.

== Competitors ==
Moldova sent two athletes including a woman who competed in four biathlon events.

Sport	Men	Women	Total
Biathlon	1	1	2
Total	1	1	2

== Biathlon ==
Biathlon competitions were held at Birkebeineren Skistadion, Lillehammer. The biathlon events consisted of a skiing a specific course multiple times depending on the length of the competition, with intermediate shooting at various positions. For every shot missed, a penalty of one minute is applied in individual events, and the participant is required to ski through a penalty loop in sprint events.

Two athletes from Moldova participated across four events in biathlon. Flag-bearer Vasily Gherghy participated in his only Winter Olympics at the Games. Elena Gorohova, who made her debut at the Games, would go on to participate in three more Winter Olympic Games from 1998 to 2006.

In the men's sprint, Gherghy was the last to complete the 10 km course with a time of 34 minutes and 48 seconds. In the subsequent men's individual event, Gherghy again finished last of the 70 competitors, almost 20 minutes behind the gold medal winner Sergey Tarasov of Russia. In the women's events, Gorohova similarly registered two last place finishes in the 7.5 km sprint and 15 km individual events.

Athlete	Event	Final		
Athlete	Event	Time	Pen.	Rank
Vasily Gherghy	Men's 10 km sprint	34:48.0	3	68
Vasily Gherghy	Men's 20 km individual	1:16:30.4	9	70
Elena Gorohova	Women's 7.5 km sprint	35:04.1	7	69
Elena Gorohova	Women's 15 km individual	1:13:33.1	14	68
