= Moldova at the 2026 Winter Olympics =

- Flag of Moldova
- IOC code: MDA
- NOC: National Olympic Committee of the Republic of Moldova
- Website: www.olympic.md (in Romanian)

in Milan and Cortina d'Ampezzo, Italy 6 February 2026 – 22 February 2026
- Competitors: 5 (3 men and 2 women) in 2 sports
- Flag bearers (opening): Iulian Luchin & Elizaveta Hlusovici
- Flag bearer (closing): Iulian Luchin
- Medals: Gold 0 Silver 0 Bronze 0 Total 0

Winter Olympics appearances (overview)
- 1994; 1998; 2002; 2006; 2010; 2014; 2018; 2022; 2026

Other related appearances
- Romania (1924–1936); Soviet Union (1956–1988)

Moldova competed at the 2026 Winter Olympics in Milan and Cortina d'Ampezzo, Italy, from 6 to 22 February 2026. The country's participation in the Games marked its ninth appearance at the Winter Olympics since its debut in the 1994 Games.

Cross-country skiers Iulian Luchin and Elizaveta Hlusovici were the country's flagbearer during the opening ceremony. Meanwhile, Iulian Luchin was the country's flagbearer during the closing ceremony.

== Competitors ==
The following is the list of number of competitors participating at the Games per sport/discipline.

Sport	Men	Women	Total
Biathlon	2	1	3
Cross-country skiing	1	1	2
Total	3	2	5

== Biathlon ==
Athlete	Event	Time	Misses	Rank
Pavel Magazeev	Men's individual	58:02.3	3 (1+1+0+1)	45
Pavel Magazeev	Men's sprint	26:43.4	3 (1+2)	78
Maksim Makarov	Men's individual	1:04:54.4	5 (1+1+1+2)	84
Maksim Makarov	Men's sprint	27:24.8	3 (3+0)	86
Alina Stremous	Women's individual	43:46.5	0 (0+0+0+0)	14
Alina Stremous	Women's sprint	24:04.2	3 (1+2)	73

== Cross-country skiing ==
Following the completion of the 2025–26 FIS Cross-Country World Cup in the first World Cup period (28 November – 14 December 2025), Moldova qualified one female and one male athlete.

Distance

Athlete	Event	Final		
Athlete	Event	Time	Deficit	Rank
Iulian Luchin	Men's 10 km freestyle	26:51.0	+6:14.8	96
Elizaveta Hlusovici	Women's 10 km freestyle	31:29.1	+8:39.9	104
