= Moldova at the Olympics =

- IOC code: MDA
- NOC: National Olympic Committee of the Republic of Moldova
- Website: www.olympic.md (in Romanian)
- Medals Ranked 122nd: Gold 0 Silver 3 Bronze 7 Total 10

Summer appearances
- 1996; 2000; 2004; 2008; 2012; 2016; 2020; 2024; 2028

Winter appearances
- 1994; 1998; 2002; 2006; 2010; 2014; 2018; 2022; 2026

Other related appearances
- Russian Empire (1900–1912); Romania (1924–1936); Soviet Union (1952–1988); Unified Team (1992)

The Republic of Moldova first participated at the Olympic Games as an independent nation in 1994 and has sent athletes to compete in every Olympics since then.

Previously, Moldovan athletes competed as a part of Romania from 1924 to 1936, then as a part of the Soviet Union from 1952 to 1988, and after the dissolution of the Soviet Union, Moldova was a part of the Unified Team in 1992.

The nation has not won any medals at the Winter Olympic Games.

The National Olympic Committee of the Republic of Moldova was created in 1991 and recognized by the International Olympic Committee in 1993.

== Medal tables ==
=== Medals by Summer Games ===
Games	Athletes	Gold	Silver	Bronze	Total	Rank
1900–1912	as part of the Russian Empire					
1924–1936	as part of Romania					
1948 London	did not participate					
1952–1988	as part of the Soviet Union					
1992 Barcelona	as part of the Unified Team					
1996 Atlanta	40	0	1	1	2	58
2000 Sydney	34	0	1	1	2	61
2004 Athens	33	0	0	0	0	–
2008 Beijing	29	0	0	1	1	80
2012 London	21	0	0	0	0	–
2016 Rio de Janeiro	23	0	0	0	0	–
2020 Tokyo	20	0	0	1	1	86
2024 Paris	26	0	1	3	4	72
2028 Los Angeles	future event					
2032 Brisbane	future event					
Total		0	3	7	10	122

=== Medals by Winter Games ===
Games	Athletes	Gold	Silver	Bronze	Total	Rank
1924–1936	as part of Romania					
1948 St. Moritz	did not participate					
1952 Oslo	did not participate					
1956–1988	as part of the Soviet Union					
1992 Albertville	as part of the Unified Team					
1994 Lillehammer	2	0	0	0	0	–
1998 Nagano	2	0	0	0	0	–
2002 Salt Lake City	5	0	0	0	0	–
2006 Turin	6	0	0	0	0	–
2010 Vancouver	7	0	0	0	0	–
2014 Sochi	4	0	0	0	0	–
2018 Pyeongchang	2	0	0	0	0	–
2022 Beijing	5	0	0	0	0	–
2026 Milano Cortina	5	0	0	0	0	–
2030 French Alps	future event					
2034 Utah	future event					
Total		0	0	0	0	–

=== Medals by summer sport ===
Sport	Gold	Silver	Bronze	Total
Canoeing	0	1	2	3
Wrestling	0	1	1	2
Shooting	0	1	0	1
Boxing	0	0	2	2
Judo	0	0	2	2
Totals (5 entries)	0	3	7	10

== List of medalists ==
Medal	Name	Games	Sport	Event
Silver	Nicolae Juravschi; Viktor Reneysky	1996 Atlanta	Canoeing	Men's C-2 500 metres
Bronze	Sergei Mureiko	1996 Atlanta	Wrestling	Men's Greco-Roman super heavyweight
Silver	Oleg Moldovan	2000 Sydney	Shooting	Men's 10 metre running target
Bronze	Vitalie Grușac	2000 Sydney	Boxing	Men's welterweight
Bronze	Veaceslav Gojan	2008 Beijing	Boxing	Men's bantamweight
Bronze	Serghei Tarnovschi	2020 Tokyo	Canoeing	Men's C-1 1000 metres
Bronze	Denis Vieru	2024 Paris	Judo	Men's 66 kg
Bronze	Adil Osmanov	2024 Paris	Judo	Men's 73 kg
Bronze	Serghei Tarnovschi	2024 Paris	Canoeing	Men's C-1 1000 metres
Silver	Anastasia Nichita	2024 Paris	Wrestling	Women's freestyle 57 kg

== See also ==
- List of flag bearers for Moldova at the Olympics
- Category:Olympic competitors for Moldova
- Moldova at the Paralympics
