= Bogdan Macovei (luger) =

Romanian-born Moldovan luger

Personal information
- Nationality: Moldova
- Born: January 28, 1983 (age 43) Vatra Dornei, Romania
- Height: 172 cm (5 ft 8 in)
- Weight: 70 kg (154 lb)

Sport
- Sport: Alpine skiing

Bogdan Macovei (born 28 January 1983 in Vatra Dornei, Romania) is a Romanian-born luger who competed for Moldova. He represented Moldova in three Winter Olympics from 2006 to 2014. He earned his best finish of 30th in the men's singles event at Turin in the 2006 Winter Olympics. He had also competed in multiple FIL World Luge Championships, and Luge World Cups.

== Early life ==
Bogdan Macovei was born on 28 January 1983 in Vatra Dornei in Romania. He later became a naturalized Molodovan citizen.

== Career ==
Bogdan Macovei was named in the Moldovan team for the 2006 Winter Olympics. This was his debut at the Olympics. In the event, Macovei was ranked second to last amongst the 36 competitors after his first run. He progressively improved his time over the next three runs to move up the leader board. In the fourth and final run, he recorded his best time of 53.599 seconds. He was classified 30th overall with a time of just over three minutes and 38 seconds, nearly 12 seconds behind the winner Armin Zöggeler of Italy.

Macovei competed in multiple FIL World Luge Championships, and Luge World Cups. In the 2009-10 Luge World Cup, he finished in 46th place. In February 2010, he was named in the Moldovan team for the second consecutive Winter Olympics. In his first run, Macovei clocked a time of 50.325 seconds, finishing nearly two seconds behind the leader Felix Loch. In the second run, he had his best run, clocking 50.175 to be ranked 32nd amongst the 39 participants. In the penultimate run, he completed the circuit with a time of 50.423 to be ranked 33rd. In the final attempt, he clocked 50.331 to finish with a total time of 3:21.354 and was classified in the 33rd position out of the 39 athletes.

In his first FIL World Luge Championships in 2011, he finished in 33rd place in the men's singles event. In the subsequent World Championships held in Germany, he recorded a 37th place finish. In 2014, he was named in the Moldovan team for the 2014 Winter Olympics at Sochi. In his first run, Macovei clocked a time of 54.591 seconds, finishing more than two seconds behind the leader Albert Demchenko. In the second run, he clocked 54.271 to be ranked 35th amongst the 39 participants. In the penultimate run, he completed the circuit with a slightly better time of 53.295 to be ranked 35th. He had his best run in the final attempt, finishing 36th with a time of 53.779. He clocked a total time of 3:36.566 and was classified in the 36th position out of the 39 athletes. He competed in every season of the Luge World Cup till the 2015-16 season.
