= Moldova at the 2022 Winter Olympics =

- Flag of Moldova
- IOC code: MDA
- NOC: National Olympic Committee of the Republic of Moldova
- Website: www.olympic.md (in Romanian)

in Beijing, China 4–20 February 2022
- Competitors: 5 (2 men and 3 women) in 2 sports
- Flag bearer (opening): Doina Descalui
- Flag bearer (closing): Alina Stremous
- Medals: Gold 0 Silver 0 Bronze 0 Total 0

Winter Olympics appearances (overview)
- 1994; 1998; 2002; 2006; 2010; 2014; 2018; 2022; 2026

Other related appearances
- Romania (1924–1936); Soviet Union (1956–1988)

Moldova participated at the 2022 Winter Olympics in Beijing, China held between 4 and 20 February 2022. The country's participation in the Games marked its eighth appearance at the Winter Olympics since its debut in the 1994 Games.

The Moldovan team consisted of five athletes including three women who competed across two sports. Luger Doina Descalui served as the country's flag-bearer during the opening ceremony and biathlete Alina Stremous was the flag-bearer during the closing ceremony. Moldova did not win any medal in the Games, and has not won a Winter Olympics medal as of these Games.

== Background ==
Moldova achieved independence after the break-up of Soviet Union in 1991 and its National Olympic Committee was formed on 29 January 1991. As the National Olympic Committee of the Republic of Moldova was only recognized by the International Olympic Committee (IOC) in 1993, Moldovan athletes participated as a part of a unified team at the 1992 Summer Olympics at Barcelona. Moldavan athletes competed from 1952 to 1988 as a part of Soviet Union. The 1994 Winter Olympics marked Moldova's first participation as an independent nation in the Olympic Games. After the nation made its debut in the Winter Olympics at the 1994 Games, this edition of the Games in 2022 marked the nation's eighth appearance at the Winter Games.

The 2022 Winter Olympics was held in Beijing held between 4 and 20 February 2022. The Moldovan team consisted of five athletes including three women who competed across two sports. Luger Doina Descalui served as the country's flag-bearer during the opening ceremony. Biathlete Alina Stremous was the flag-bearer during the closing ceremony. Moldova did not win any medal in the Games, and has not won a Winter Olympics medal as of these Games.

== Competitors ==
Moldova sent five athletes including three women who competed in two sports at the Games.

Sport	Men	Women	Total
Biathlon	2	2	4
Luge	0	1	1
Total	2	3	5

== Biathlon ==
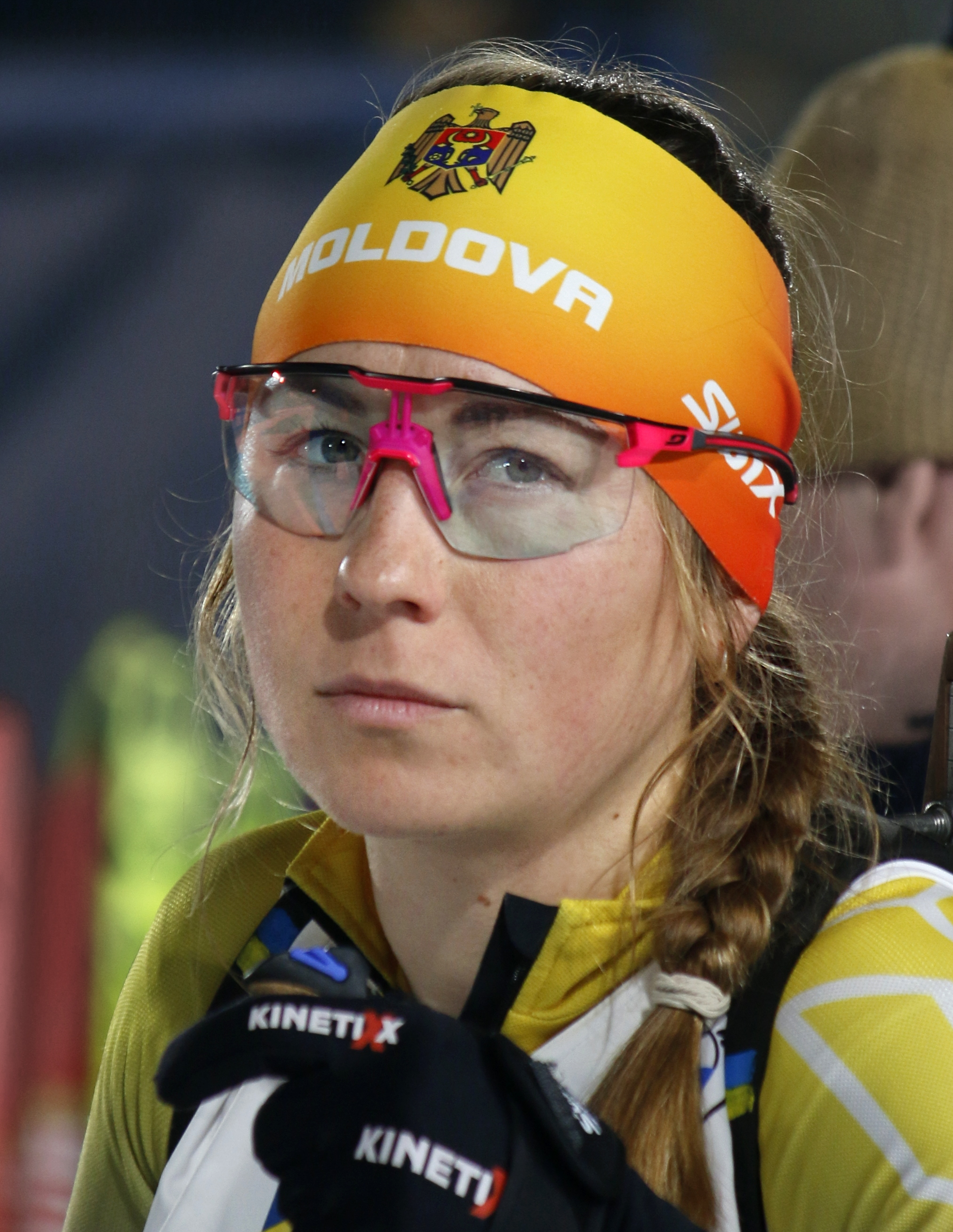
Alla Ghilenko made her debut at the Winter Games

Qualification

The qualification criteria for the biathlon events was based on the points accumulated by the National Olympic Committees (NOC) for individual results achieved by the nation's participants in the 2020–21 and 2021–22 Biathlon World Cups. Based on the points table released on 16 January 2022 by the International Biathlon Union (IBU), the NOCs in the top 28 were granted specific number of places based on their ranking. Moldova was granted four places including two for women based on the IBC points for nations ranked outside the automatic placings.

Moldova sent a team of four athletes who competed in six individual events. Despite the eligibility, the Moldovan team did not enter the mixed relay competition. In the men's category, this was the first Winter Games for the 33-year old Pavel Magazeev and 26-year old Maksim Makarov. In the women's category, Alla Ghilenko and Alina Stremous also made their debuts at the Games. Ghilenko was born in Ukraine, while Stremous was born in Russia.

Event

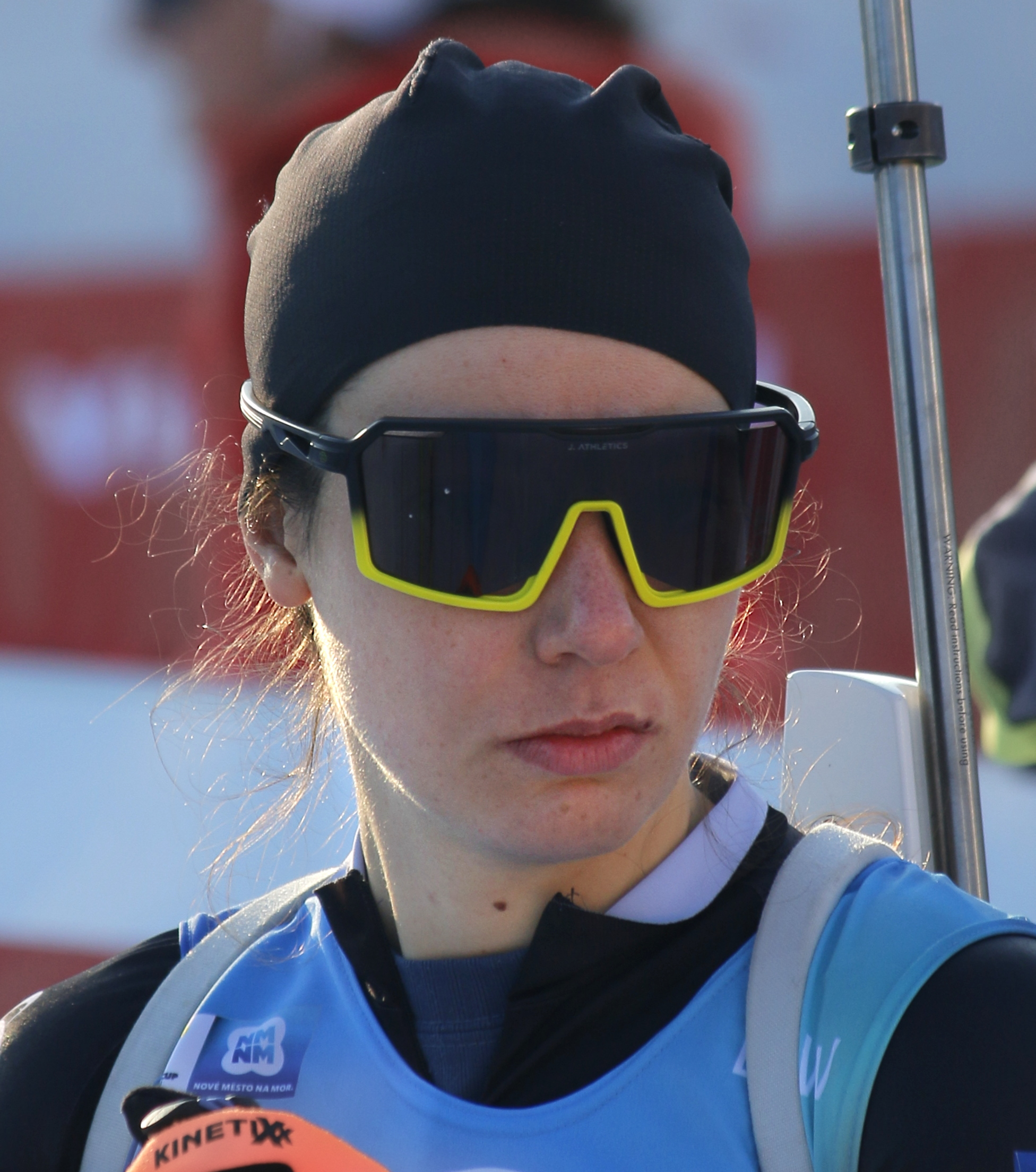
Alina Stremous participated in four individual events

Biathlon competitions were held from 6 to 20 February in the Zhangjiakou Nordic and Biathlon Centre in Zhangjiakou, Hebei Province. The biathlon events consisted of a skiing a specific course multiple times depending on the length of the competition, with intermediate shooting at various positions. For every shot missed, a penalty of one minute is applied in individual events, and the participant is required to ski through a penalty loop in sprint events.

In the men's individual event, Magazeev finished 26th amongst the 92 competitors with a time of over 52 minutes and 41 seconds. In the sprint event, Magazeev finished 79th while Makarov crossed the finish line further back in 93rd place more than two minutes behind his compatriot. Ghilenko participated in two women's events where she was ranked 72nd and 86th in the individual and sprint events respectively. Stremous participated in all four women's individual events. She recorded the best finish of all Moldovan competitors including a top ten finish in the sprint event, where she did not miss a single shooting target.

Athlete	Event	Time	Misses	Rank
Pavel Magazeev	Men's individual	52:41.7	2 (1+1+0+0)	26
Pavel Magazeev	Men's sprint	27:25.1	3 (2+1)	79
Maksim Makarov	Men's sprint	29:45.6	5 (2+3)	93
Alla Ghilenko	Women's individual	52:28.3	2 (0+1+0+1)	72
Alla Ghilenko	Women's sprint	26:04.6	4 (2+2)	86
Alina Stremous	Women's individual	49:07.5	4 (1+2+0+1)	37
Alina Stremous	Women's mass start	47:30.0	9 (1+2+3+3)	30
Alina Stremous	Women's pursuit	38:01.3	2 (0+0+1+1)	16
Alina Stremous	Women's sprint	21:59.5	0 (0+0)	10

== Luge ==
Qualification

As per the qualification criteria laid down by the International Luge Federation, a total of 106 spots were available for the Games. The qualification was based on the cumulative world ranking points from 1 July 2021 to 10 January 2022. The NOCs of the top ranked 50 athletes received an entry into the respective men or women's event. The remaining spots were distributed to the NOCs additionally based on their rankings. Moldova received one spot in the women's event based on the results from the 2021–22 Luge World Cup season. Flag-bearer Doina Descalui made her debut at the Games.

Competition

The event was held on 7 and 8 February 202 at the Yanqing National Sliding Centre in West Dazhuangke, Yanqing district. In her first run, Descalui clocked a time of 1:01.928, finishing more than three seconds behind the leader Natalie Geisenberger. In the second run, she clocked 1:02.129 to be ranked 31st amongst the 35 participants. In the third run, she completed the circuit with a time of 1:02.174 to be ranked 32nd. As only the top 20 finishers advanced to the fourth run, she was classified in the 32nd position in the overall table.

Athlete	Event	Run 1		Run 2		Run 3		Run 4		Total	
Athlete	Event	Time	Rank	Time	Rank	Time	Rank	Time	Rank	Time	Rank
Doina Descalui	Women's singles	1:01.928	34	1:02.129	31	1:02.174	32	Did not advance		3:06.294	32
