= Ilie Bria =

Moldovan cross-country skier (born 1989)

Personal information
- Nationality: Moldovan
- Born: 23 March 1989 (age 36)

Sport
- Sport: Cross-country skiing

Ilie Bria (born 23 March 1989) is a Moldovan cross-country skier. He competed in the men's sprint event at the 2006 Winter Olympics.
