= Valentina Ciurina =

Moldovan biathlete (born 1978)

Personal information
- Nationality: Moldovan
- Born: 30 August 1978 (age 46)

Sport
- Sport: Biathlon

Valentina Ciurina (born 30 August 1978) is a Moldovan biathlete. She competed at the 2002 Winter Olympics and the 2006 Winter Olympics.
