= Asuka Hachisuka =

Japanese biathlete (born 1992)

Asuka Hatchisuka
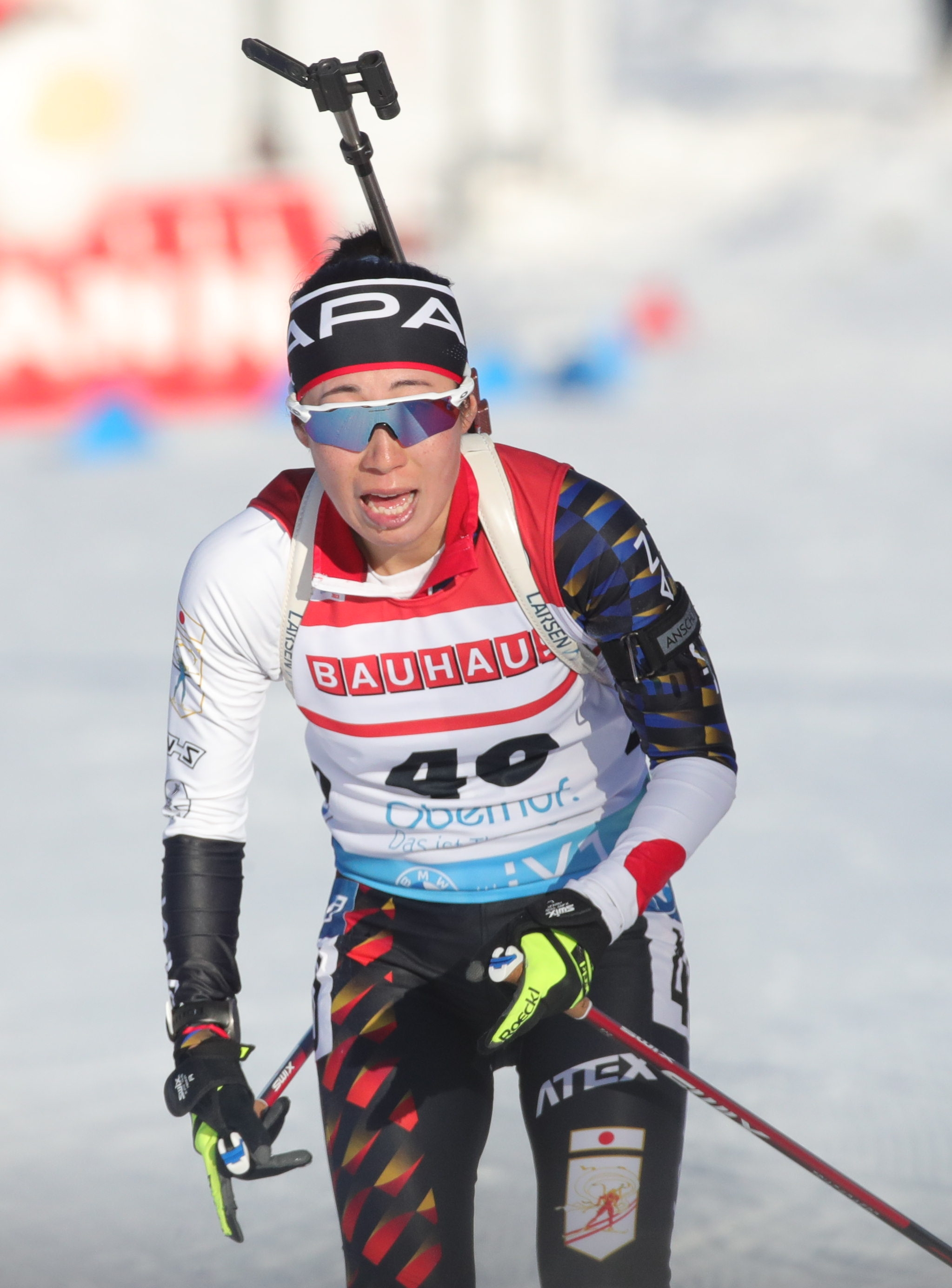

Personal information
- Born: 26 September 1992 (age 32); Tsukude (now Shinshiro), Japan

Sport
- Country: Japan
- Sport: Biathlon

Asuka Hachisuka (蜂須賀 明香, Hachisuka Asuka; born 26 September 1992) is a Japanese biathlete. She competed in both the 2018 Winter Olympics and the 2022 Winter Olympics.

== Career results ==
=== Olympic Games ===
0 medals

Event	Individual	Sprint	Pursuit	Mass start	Relay	Mixed relay
(South Korea) 2018 Pyeongchang	81st	—	—	—	—	—
(China) 2022 Beijing	65th	87th	—	—	17th	—

=== World Championships ===
0 medals

Event	Individual	Sprint	Pursuit	Mass start	Relay	Mixed relay	Single mixed relay
(Sweden) 2019 Östersund	—	—	—	—	19th	—	—
(Italy) 2020 Antholz	—	—	—	—	21st	—	—
(Slovenia) 2021 Pokljuka	—	—	—	—	15th	—	—
(Germany) 2023 Oberhof	78th	87th	—	—	16th	—	—
