= Victor Pînzaru =

Moldovan biathlete (born 1992)

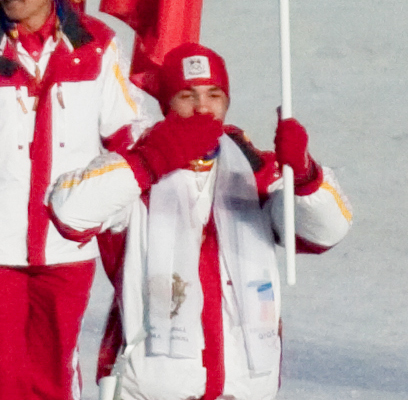
- Victor Pînzaru at the 2010 Winter Olympics

Personal information
- Nationality: Moldova
- Born: February 11, 1992 (age 34) Drochia
- Height: 187 cm (6 ft 2 in)
- Weight: 97 kg (214 lb)

Sport
- Sport: Biathlon; Cross-country skiing

Victor Pinzaru (born February 11, 1992) is a Moldovan athlete who competes in biathlon and cross-country skiing. He represented Moldova at the 2010 and 2014 Winter Olympics. He also served as the flag-bearer for Moldova during the opening and closing ceremonies of both the Olympic Games.

== Early life ==
Victor Pinzaru was born on 11 February 1992 at Drochia in Drochia district. He served as a warrant officer in the Moldovan Army.

== Career ==
Pinzaru started competing in international cross-country skiing events since 2009. He started competing in the Biathlon World Cup season in 2009. He took part in the cross-country sprint race in the FIS Nordic World Ski Championships 2009 at Liberec in Czech Republic, in which he finished 84th amongst the 135 participants. Pinzaru was named to the Moldovan team for the 2010 Winter Olympics held at Vancouver. He served as the country's flag-bearer during the opening and closing ceremonies. He finished 70th in the sprint event and 85th in the individual event in biathlon.

In 2011, Pinzaru took part in the cross-country sprint race in the FIS Nordic World Ski Championships at Oslo in Norway, in which he finished 88th amongst the 122 participants. He achieved his first top ten finish at the Balkan cup freestyle skiing event held in Romania in February 2012. In the FIS Nordic World Ski Championships 2013 in Val di Fiemme, he took part in both sprint and freestyle events in cross-country skiing.

Pinzaru was named to the Moldovan team for the 2014 Winter Olympics held at Sochi. For the second consecutive Winter Games, he was Moldova's flag bearer during the opening and closing ceremonies. In the men's sprint event, he finished 77th in the qualification rounds and failed to advance to the next round. In 2015, he took part in his last FIS Nordic World Ski Championships at Falun in Sweden in both the sprint and freestyle events.
