= Alla Ghilenko =

Moldovan biathlete (born 1992)

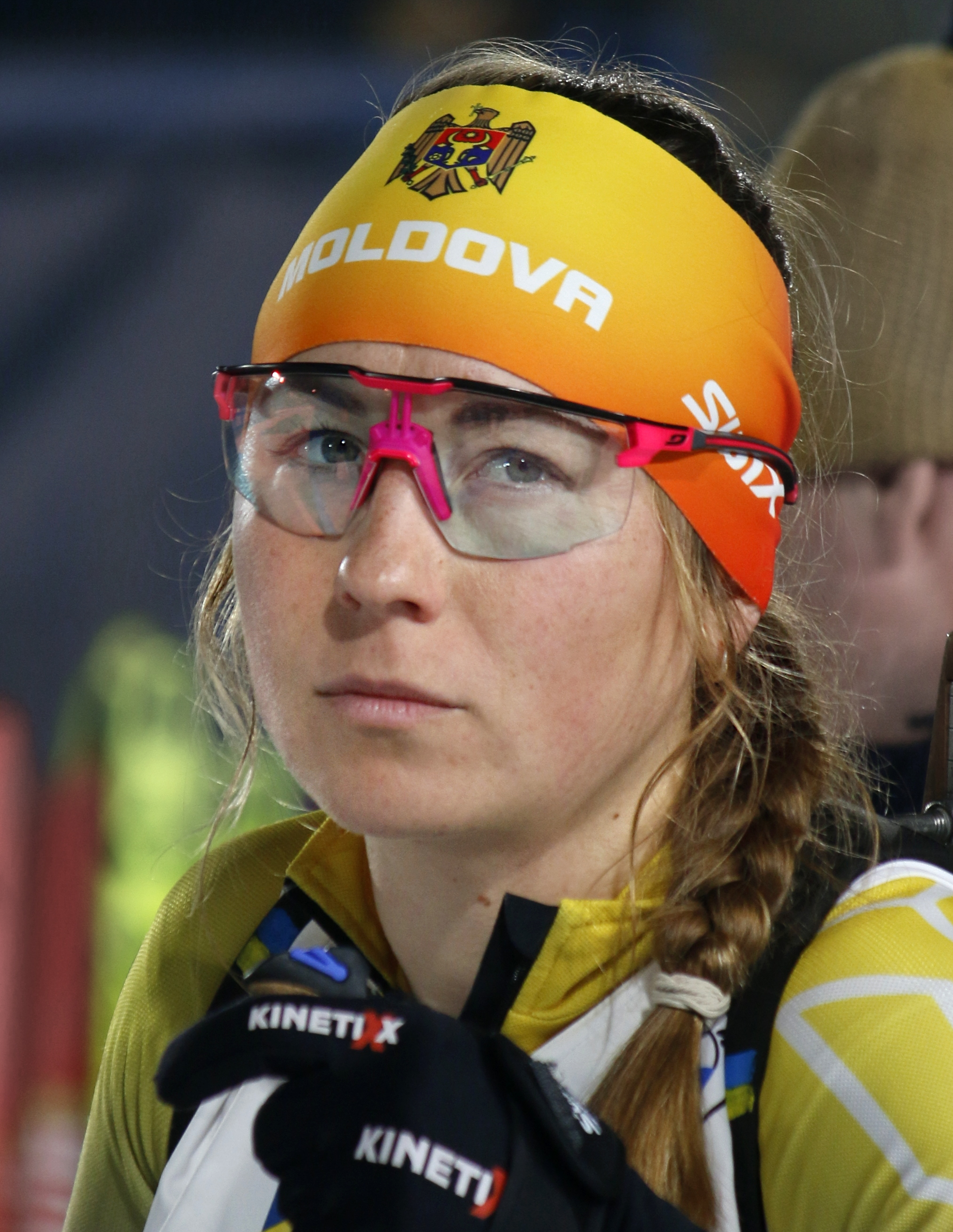
Alla Ghilenko in 2024

Alla Ghilenko (born 12 June 1992) is a Moldovan biathlete. She was born in Varva, Ukraine. She competed at the 2022 Winter Olympics, in Women's individual, and Women's sprint.

== Career ==
Ghilenko originally competed for Ukraine and was in their squad for the 2014–15 season. She started competing for Moldova for the 2016–17 skiing season. She qualified for the FIS Nordic World Ski Championships 2017 where she participated in the women's sprint and placed 64th of 108th and in the qualifying distance 5 kilometre placing 19th of 35 but didn't go on to race the official distance of 10 kilometre.

She competed at the 2017–18 Biathlon IBU Cup and later in the 2020–21 Biathlon World Cups. She finished 37th in the sprint event in Nové Město na Moravě, Czech Republic, which was a personal best. In June 2021, she became an ambassador of the International Biathlon Union.

Ghilenko competed at the 2022 Winter Olympics. Ghilenko commented: "I am thrilled to have qualified for the Olympics, which is very difficult in biathlon nowadays. For any athlete, qualifying is already the best performance of his career." In March 2022, she sent messages of support to Ukraine following the Russian invasion of the country.

== Career results ==
=== Olympic Games ===
0 medals

Event	Individual	Sprint	Pursuit	Mass start	Relay	Mixed relay
(China) 2022 Beijing	72nd	86th	—	—	—	—

=== World Championships ===
0 medals

Event	Individual	Sprint	Pursuit	Mass start	Relay	Mixed relay	Single mixed relay
(Austria) 2017 Hochfilzen	99th	98th	—	—	—	—	—
(Sweden) 2019 Östersund	DNS	84th	—	—	—	—	21st
(Italy) 2020 Antholz	80th	86th	—	—	—	—	—
(Slovenia) 2021 Pokljuka	DNF	43rd	57th	—	—	22nd	27th
(Germany) 2023 Oberhof	DNS	77th	—	—	—	23rd	—
(Czech Republic) 2024 Nové Město na Moravě	88th	72nd	—	—	—	18th	19th
(Switzerland) 2025 Lenzerheide	DNF	90th	—	—	—	—	—
