= Ion Bucșa =

Moldovan biathlete (born 1968)

Personal information
- Nationality: Moldovan
- Born: 28 February 1968 (age 57); Kotovsk, Moldovian SSR, Soviet Union
- Children: Cristina Bucșa

Sport
- Sport: Biathlon

Ion Bucșa (born 28 February 1968), also known as Ivan Bucșa, is a Moldovan biathlete who competed at the 1998 and 2002 Winter Olympics. He is the father and coach of Spanish tennis player Cristina Bucșa.
