= National Olympic Committee of the Republic of Moldova =

National Olympic Committee

- Country: Republic of Moldova
- [[|]]
- Code: MDA
- Created: 1991
- Recognized: 1993
- Continental Association: EOC
- Headquarters: Chișinău, Moldova
- President: Nicolae Juravschi
- Secretary General: Cristina Vasilianov
- Website: www.olympic.md

The National Olympic Committee of the Republic of Moldova (Romanian: Comitetul Național Olimpic al Republicii Moldova, CNORM; IOC Code: MDA) is responsible for Republic of Moldova's participation in the Olympic Games.

Its organizational framework includes the Executive Committee, responsible for strategic decisions and leadership, and the Commission of Censors, which ensures financial oversight and transparency.

== History ==
The National Olympic Committee of the Republic of Moldova was formed in 1991 in Chișinău, and recognized two years later.

== See also ==
- Moldova at the Olympics
