= Cross-country skiing at the 2010 Winter Olympics – Men's 15 kilometre freestyle =

Men's 15 kilometre freestyle at the XXI Olympic Winter Games
- Venue: Whistler Olympic Park
- Dates: 15 February 2010
- Competitors: 96 from 50 nations
- Winning time: 33:36.3

Medalists
1st place, gold medalist(s)		Dario Cologna	Switzerland
2nd place, silver medalist(s)		Pietro Piller Cottrer	Italy
3rd place, bronze medalist(s)		Lukáš Bauer	Czech Republic

The men's 15 kilometre freestyle cross-country skiing competition at the 2010 Winter Olympics in Vancouver, Canada, was held on 15 February at Whistler Olympic Park in Whistler, British Columbia, at 12:30 PST.

Each skier starts at 30-second intervals, skiing the entire 15 kilometre course. Estonia's Andrus Veerpalu is both the two-time defending Olympic and World champion in this event, though all three were held in the classical event. Norway's Lars Berger won the 2007 world championships when it was in freestyle. The final World Cup event in men's 15 km freestyle prior to the 2010 Games took place on 5 February at Canmore, Alberta, and was won by Italy's Giorgio Di Centa.

Veerpalu did not participate to the event being in freestyle while Berger did not participate to the fact that the biathlon men's 12.5 km pursuit would take place the next day. Di Centa finished tenth in the event. Cologna is the first Swiss to win a gold medal in cross-country skiing at the Winter Olympics.

== Results ==
Rank	Bib	Name	Country	Time	Deficit
1st place, gold medalist(s)	33	Dario Cologna	Switzerland	33:36.3	+0.00
2nd place, silver medalist(s)	25	Pietro Piller Cottrer	Italy	34:00.9	+24.6
3rd place, bronze medalist(s)	34	Lukáš Bauer	Czech Republic	34:12.0	+35.7
4	35	Marcus Hellner	Sweden	34:13.5	+37.2
5	26	Vincent Vittoz	France	34:16.2	+39.9
6	13	Maurice Manificat	France	34:27.4	+51.1
7	18	Tobias Angerer	Germany	34:28.5	+52.2
8	20	Ivan Babikov	Canada	34:30.0	+53.7
9	24	Maxim Vylegzhanin	Russia	34:31.6	+55.3
10	31	Giorgio Di Centa	Italy	34:36.2	+59.9
11	19	Johan Olsson	Sweden	34:39.3	+1:03.0
12	6	Toni Livers	Switzerland	34:43.3	+1:07.0
13	1	Ville Nousiainen	Finland	34:45.5	+1:09.2
14	2	Alexey Poltaranin	Kazakhstan	34:50.5	+1:14.2
15	5	Remo Fischer	Switzerland	34:51.1	+1:14.8
15	28	Dmitry Sidorov	Russia	34:51.1	+1:14.8
17	17	Curdin Perl	Switzerland	34:51.8	+1:15.5
18	10	Martin Koukal	Czech Republic	34:53.5	+1:17.2
19	21	Valerio Checchi	Italy	34:53.7	+1:17.4
20	4	Emmanuel Jonnier	France	34:55.1	+1:18.8
21	11	Alex Harvey	Canada	34:55.6	+1:19.3
22	23	Daniel Rickardsson	Sweden	34:58.7	+1:22.4
23	9	Martin Bajčičák	Slovakia	34:59.3	+1:23.0
24	14	Thomas Moriggl	Italy	34:59.9	+1:23.6
25	3	Anders Södergren	Sweden	35:01.2	+1:24.9
26	44	Petr Sedov	Russia	35:06.2	+1:29.9
27	37	Teemu Kattilakoski	Finland	35:06.8	+1:30.5
28	7	Tord Asle Gjerdalen	Norway	35:10.5	+1:34.2
29	42	George Grey	Canada	35:13.0	+1:36.7
29	47	Martin Jakš	Czech Republic	35:13.0	+1:36.7
31	22	Sergey Shiryayev	Russia	35:14.5	+1:38.2
32	27	Jean-Marc Gaillard	France	35:20.5	+1:44.2
33	16	Martin Johnsrud Sundby	Norway	35:26.3	+1:50.0
34	38	Juha Lallukka	Finland	35:28.8	+1:52.5
35	8	Sergei Dolidovich	Belarus	35:29.4	+1:53.1
36	29	René Sommerfeldt	Germany	35:31.3	+1:55.0
37	46	Paul Constantin Pepene	Romania	35:33.7	+1:57.4
38	40	Nikolay Chebotko	Kazakhstan	35:34.1	+1:57.8
39	32	Matti Heikkinen	Finland	35:37.1	+2:00.8
40	48	Ivan Batory	Slovakia	35:38.1	+2:01.8
41	36	Petter Northug	Norway	35:39.5	+2:03.2
42	12	Ronny Hafsås	Norway	35:41.8	+2:05.5
43	52	Milan Šperl	Czech Republic	35:46.4	+2:10.1
44	30	Axel Teichmann	Germany	35:47.0	+2:10.7
45	50	Ben Sim	Australia	35:48.6	+2:12.3
46	39	Tom Reichelt	Germany	35:50.4	+2:14.1
47	43	Sergey Cherepanov	Kazakhstan	35:50.8	+2:14.5
48	51	James Southam	United States	35:58.2	+2:21.9
49	45	Nobu Naruse	Japan	36:01.6	+2:25.3
50	62	Veselin Tzinzov	Bulgaria	36:11.7	+2:35.4
51	41	Aivar Rehemaa	Estonia	36:13.5	+2:37.2
52	64	Gordon Jewett	Canada	36:17.9	+2:41.6
53	56	Vicenc Vilarrubla	Spain	36:22.7	+2:46.4
54	66	Michal Malak	Slovakia	36:22.8	+2:46.5
55	60	Andrew Musgrave	Great Britain	36:32.4	+2:56.1
56	53	Yevgeniy Velichko	Kazakhstan	36:33.0	+2:56.7
57	67	Petrică Hogiu	Romania	36:39.5	+3:03.2
58	59	Garrott Kuzzy	United States	36:41.5	+3:05.2
59	15	Kris Freeman	United States	36:41.6	+3:05.3
60	54	Aliaksei Ivanou	Belarus	36:48.2	+3:11.9
61	55	Roman Leybyuk	Ukraine	36:49.7	+3:13.4
62	61	Olexandr Putsko	Ukraine	37:09.8	+3:33.5
63	80	Leanid Karneyenka	Belarus	37:29.2	+3:52.9
64	69	Simi Hamilton	United States	37:30.5	+3:54.2
65	57	Diego Ruiz	Spain	37:31.8	+3:55.5
66	49	Maciej Kreczmer	Poland	37:38.0	+4:01.7
67	58	Karel Tammjärv	Estonia	37:38.4	+4:02.1
68	65	Xu Wenlong	China	37:39.5	+4:03.2
69	63	Javier Gutierrez	Spain	37:55.7	+4:19.4
70	76	Sergey Mikayelyan	Armenia	37:58.9	+4:22.6
71	68	Aleksei Novoselski	Lithuania	38:01.6	+4:25.3
72	74	Jānis Paipals	Latvia	38:18.0	+4:41.7
73	70	Francesc Soulie	Andorra	38:36.0	+4:59.7
74	71	Andrew Young	Great Britain	38:45.1	+5:08.8
75	77	Andrej Burić	Croatia	38:51.0	+5:14.7
76	73	Jonas Thor Olsen	Denmark	39:01.8	+5:25.5
77	78	Sebahattin Oğlago	Turkey	39:03.0	+5:26.7
78	83	Mladen Plakalović	Bosnia and Herzegovina	39:41.4	+6:05.1
79	75	Lee Jun-gil	South Korea	39:51.6	+6:15.3
80	82	Amar Garibović	Serbia	40:12.0	+6:35.7
81	84	Zoltán Tagscherer	Hungary	41:15.0	+7:38.7
82	85	Carlos Lannes	Argentina	41:34.9	+7:58.6
83	90	Tashi Lundup	India	41:36.8	+8:00.5
84	94	Mehdi-Selim Khelifi	Algeria	41:38.5	+8:02.2
85	79	Darko Damjanovski	Macedonia	41:48.2	+8:11.9
86	87	Sergiu Balan	Moldova	42:12.1	+8:35.8
87	91	Khash-Erdene Khurelbataar	Mongolia	42:27.4	+8:51.1
88	88	Tucker Murphy	Bermuda	42:39.1	+9:02.8
89	81	Sattar Seid	Iran	42:41.1	+9:04.8
90	89	Leandro Ribela	Brazil	43:36.2	+9:59.9
91	86	Peter-James Barron	Ireland	43:50.4	+10:14.1
92	93	Dachhiri Sherpa	Nepal	44:26.5	+10:50.2
93	96	Robel Teklemariam	Ethiopia	45:18.9	+11:42.6
94	92	Roberto Carcelen	Peru	45:53.6	+12:17.3
95	95	Danny Silva	Portugal	49:31.4	+15:55.1
	72	Benjamin Koons	New Zealand	DNS	
