= Nepal at the 2014 Winter Olympics =

- IOC code: NEP
- NOC: Nepal Olympic Committee
- Website: www.nocnepal.org.np

in Sochi
- Competitors: 1 in 1 sport
- Flag bearers: Dachhiri Sherpa (opening and closing)
- Medals: Gold 0 Silver 0 Bronze 0 Total 0

Winter Olympics appearances (overview)
- 2002; 2006; 2010; 2014; 2018–2026

Nepal competed at the 2014 Winter Olympics in Sochi, Russia from 7 to 23 February 2014. Dachhiri Sherpa represented the country again (as he did in the previous two Winter Olympics) as the only athlete. A contingent of seven officials and one coach were also part of the Nepali delegation. Sherpa competed in his final games during the 15 km classical race.

== Cross-country skiing ==
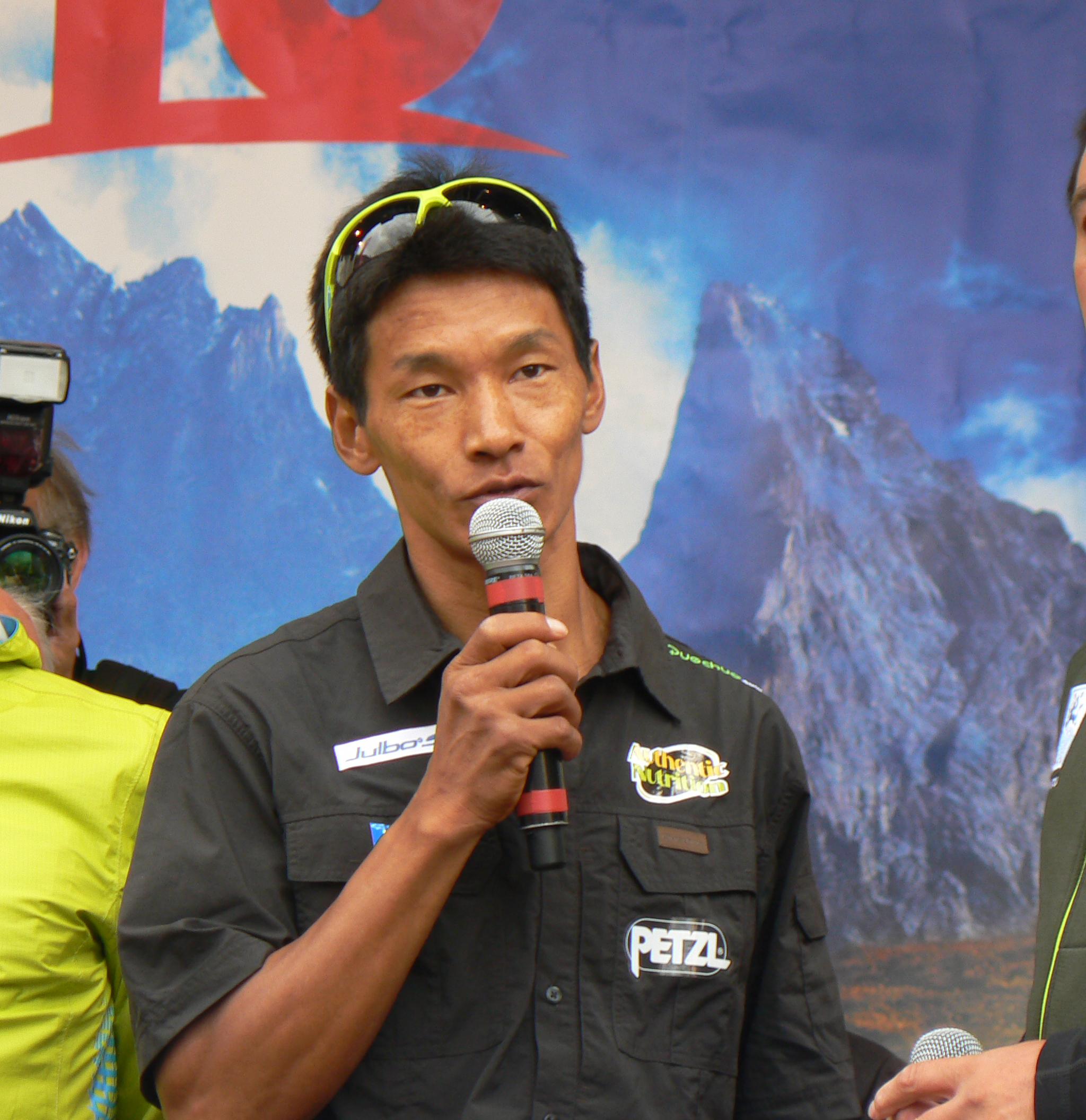
Dachhiri Sherpa competed in cross-country skiing as the only athlete from Nepal.

According to the final quota allocation released on January 20, 2014, Nepal had one athlete in qualification position. Dachhiri Sherpa finished his only race in 86th position (out of 87 athletes that completed the race).

Distance

Athlete	Event	Final		
Athlete	Event	Time	Deficit	Rank
Dachhiri Sherpa	Men's 15 km classical	55:39.3	+17:09.6	86
