= Nepal at the 2010 Winter Olympics =

- IOC code: NEP
- NOC: Nepal Olympic Committee
- Website: www.nocnepal.org.np

in Vancouver
- Competitors: 1 in 1 sport
- Flag bearer: Dachhiri Sherpa
- Medals: Gold 0 Silver 0 Bronze 0 Total 0

Winter Olympics appearances (overview)
- 2002; 2006; 2010; 2014; 2018–2026

Nepal sent a delegation to compete at the 2010 Winter Olympics in Vancouver, British Columbia, Canada from 12 to 28 February 2010. The delegation consisted of a single cross-country skier, Dachhiri Sherpa. Sherpa finished 92nd in his only event, the 15 kilometre freestyle.

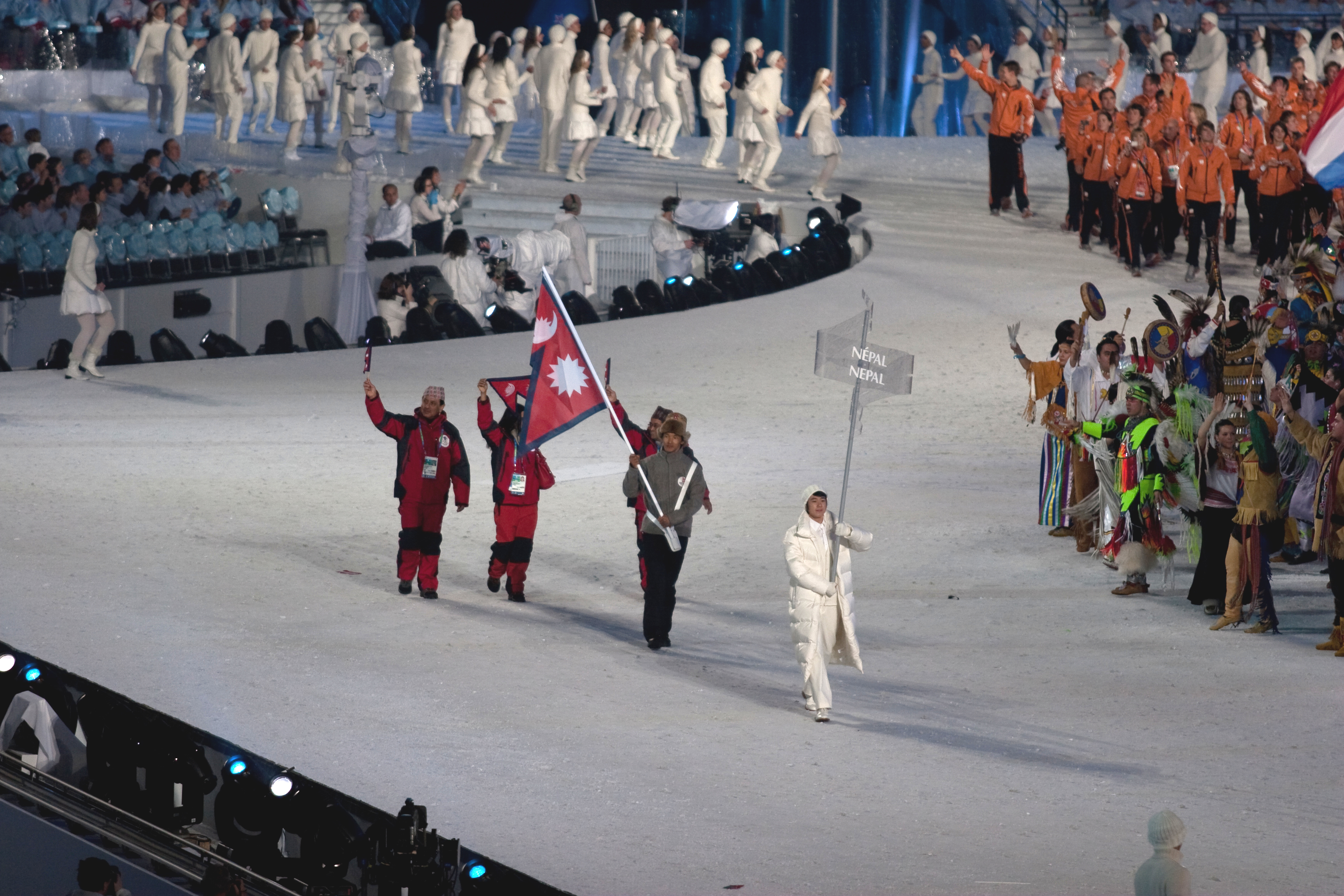
The delegation entering the stadium during the opening ceremonies.

== Background ==
Nepal first participated in Olympic competition at the 1964 Summer Olympics in Tokyo. The nation did not take part in the next Summer Olympics, but have participated in every Summer Games since the 1972 edition. Nepal did not enter the Winter Olympic Games until the 2002 Salt Lake City Olympics, they again took part in the Turin Olympics four years later. Dachhiri Sherpa was the only Nepalese athlete to participate in Vancouver, just as he had been in Turin. Sherpa was chosen as the flag bearer for both the opening ceremony and the closing ceremony.

== Cross-country skiing ==
Sherpa was 40 years old at the time of the Vancouver Olympics, and had taken up skiing at the age of 33. His only event was the 15 kilometre freestyle held on 15 February; Sherpa posted a time of 44 minutes and 26 seconds, finishing nearly 11 minutes behind gold medal time. He finished in 92nd position out of 95 competitors.

| Athlete | Event | Final | | |
| Athlete | Event | Time | Deficit | Rank |
|---|---|---|---|---|
| Dachhiri Sherpa | Men's 15 km freestyle | 44:26.5 | 10:50.2 | 92 |

== See also ==
- Nepal at the 2010 Asian Games
- Nepal at the 2010 Summer Youth Olympics
