= Moldova at the 2010 Winter Olympics =

- IOC code: MDA
- NOC: National Olympic Committee of the Republic of Moldova
- Website: www.olympic.md (in Romanian)

in Vancouver
- Competitors: 7 (5 men, 2 women) in 4 sports
- Flag bearer: Victor Pinzaru
- Medals: Gold 0 Silver 0 Bronze 0 Total 0

Winter Olympics appearances (overview)
- 1994; 1998; 2002; 2006; 2010; 2014; 2018; 2022; 2026

Other related appearances
- Romania (1924–1936); Soviet Union (1956–1988)

Moldova participated at the 2010 Winter Olympics in Vancouver, Canada held between 12 and 28 February 2010. The country's participation in the Games marked its fifth appearance at the Winter Olympics since its debut in the 1994 Games. The Moldovan team consisted of seven athletes including two women who competed across four sports. Victor Pinzaru served as the country's flag-bearer during the opening and closing ceremonies. Moldova did not win any medal in the Games, and has not won a Winter Olympics medal as of these Games.

== Background ==
Moldova achieved independence after the break-up of Soviet Union in 1991 and its National Olympic Committee was formed on 29 January 1991. As the National Olympic Committee of the Republic of Moldova was only recognized by the International Olympic Committee (IOC) in 1993, Moldovan athletes participated as a part of a unified team at the 1992 Summer Olympics at Barcelona. Moldavan athletes competed from 1952 to 1988 as a part of Soviet Union. The 1994 Winter Olympics marked Moldova's first participation as an independent nation in the Olympic Games. After the nation made its debut in the Winter Olympics at the 1994 Games, this edition of the Games in 2010 marked the nation's fifth appearance at the Winter Games.

The 2010 Winter Olympics was held in Vancouver held between 12 and 28 February 2010. The Moldovan team consisted of seven athletes including two women who competed across four sports. Victor Pinzaru served as the country's flag-bearer during the opening and closing ceremonies. Moldova did not win any medal in the Games, and has not won a Winter Olympics medal as of these Games.

== Competitors ==
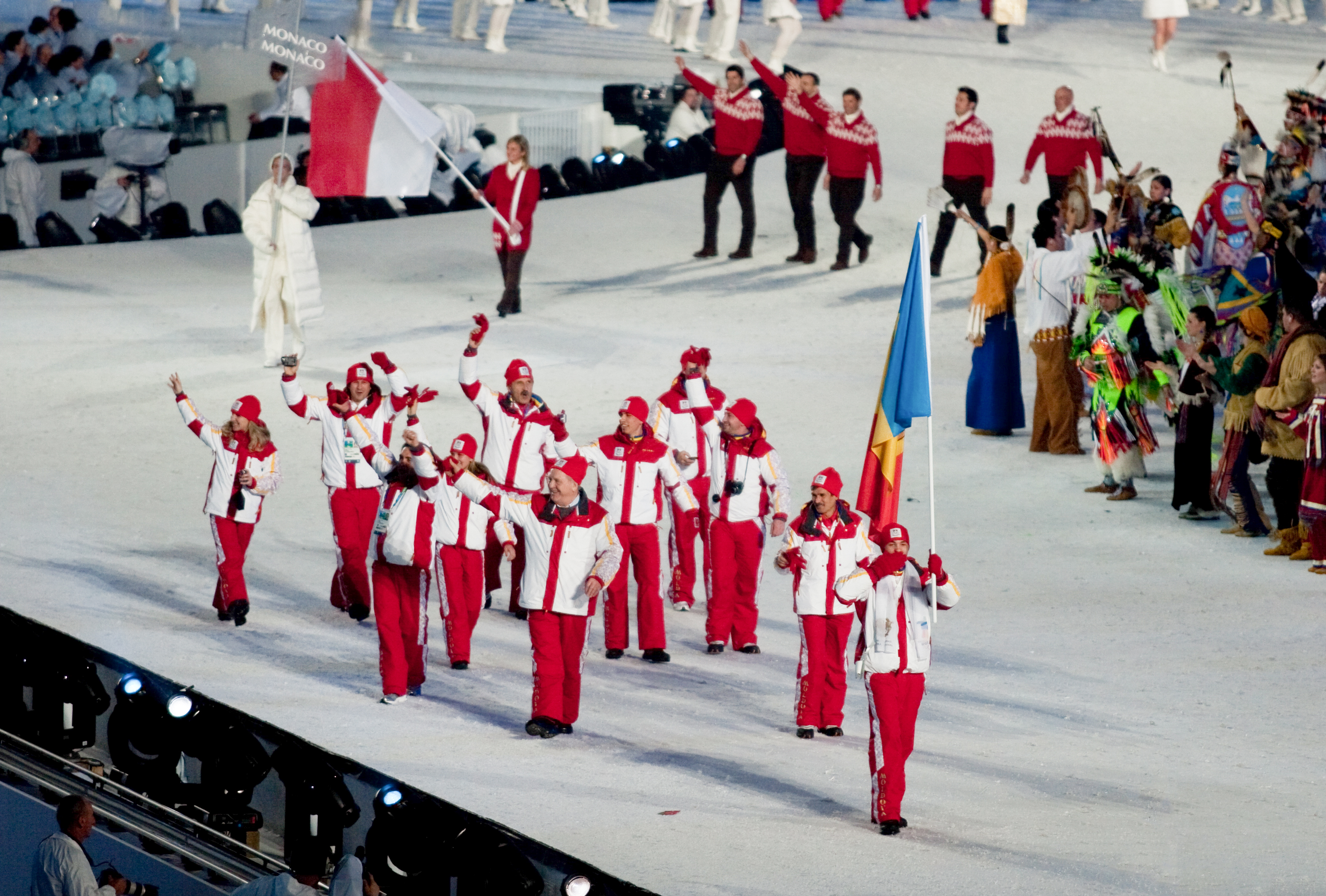
Moldovan athletes during the Parade of Nations

Moldova sent seven athletes including two women who competed in four sports at the Games.

| Sport | Men | Women | Total |
|---|---|---|---|
| Alpine skiing | 2 | 0 | 2 |
| Biathlon | 1 | 1 | 2 |
| Cross-country skiing | 1 | 1 | 2 |
| Luge | 1 | 0 | 1 |
| Total | 5 | 2 | 7 |

== Alpine skiing ==
The basic qualification mark for the alpine skiing events stipulated an average of less than 140 points in the list published by the International Ski Federation (FIS) as of 18 January 2010 for competitors ranked outside the top 100. The quotas were allocated further based on athletes satisfying other criteria, with a maximum of 22 athletes (maximum of 14 male or 14 female athletes) from a single participating NOC with not more than four participants in a single event. Christophe Roux achieved the basic qualification mark to qualify for the men's giant slalom and slalom events. Urs Imboden qualified for the slalom event. Both Roux and Imboden are naturalized former Swiss skiers.

The main event was held on 19 February 2010 at the Whistler Olympic Park. In the giant slalom event, Roux completed his first run in 1:22.70. He took slightly longer to complete the course in the second run at 1:24.42. With a combined time of 2:47.12, he finished 44th amongst 89 competitors in the overall classification. In the slalom event, Roux recorded a time of 51.90 seconds over the 610 m (2,000 ft) course in his first run, and crossed the finish with a time of 53.85 seconds in his second run. He was ranked 28th amongst the 101 competitors in the event. Imboden did not finish the event, and was not classified.

| Athlete | Event | Run 1 | Run 2 | Total | Rank |
|---|---|---|---|---|---|
| Christophe Roux | Men's giant slalom | 1:22.70 | 1:24.42 | 2:47.12 | 44 |
| Christophe Roux | Men's slalom | 51.90 | 53.85 | 1:45.75 | 28 |
| Urs Imboden | Men's slalom | DNF | | | |

== Biathlon ==
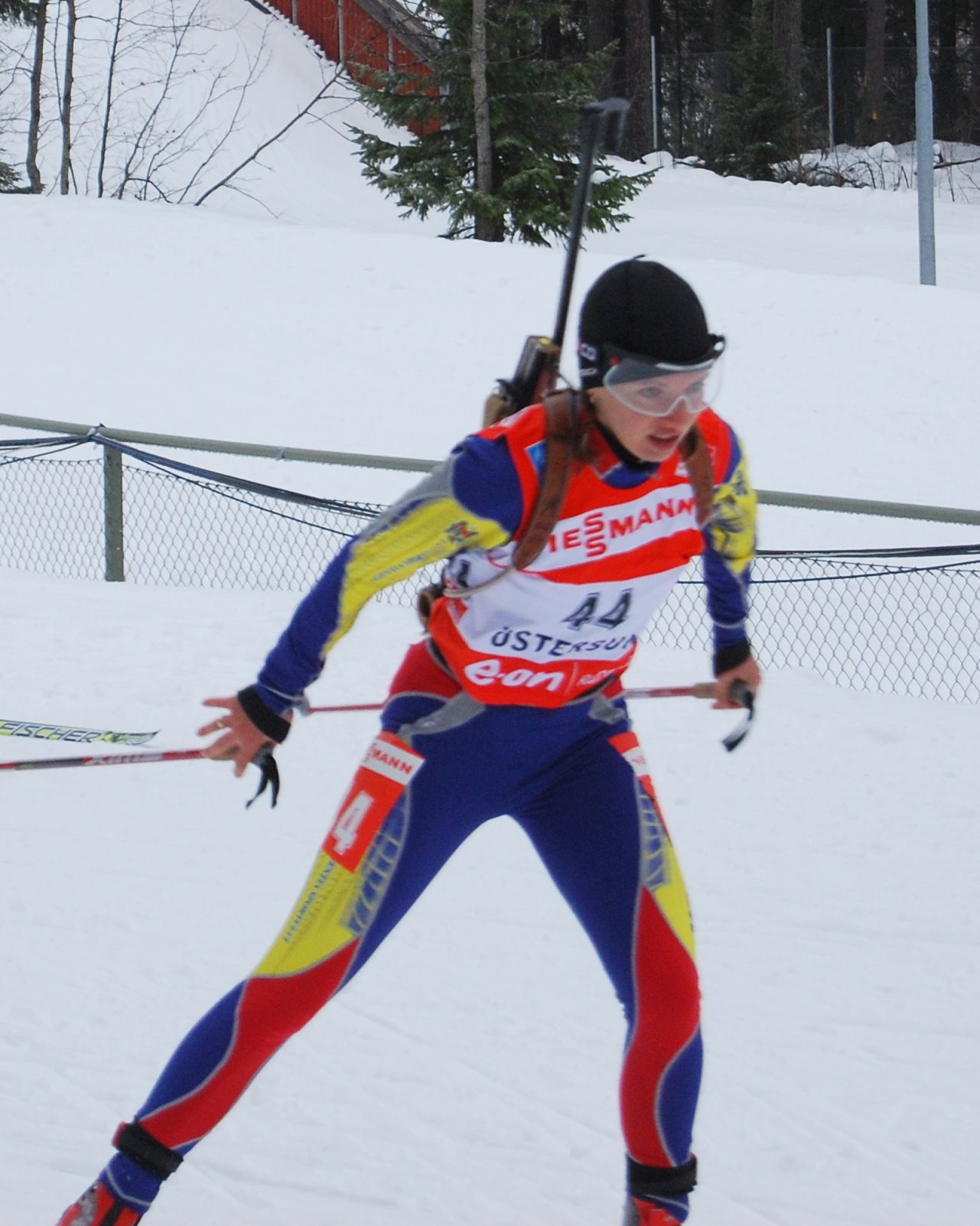
Natalia Levchenkova competed in three biathlon events

Biathlon competitions were held at the Whistler Olympic Park from 13 to 26 February. FTwo our Moldovan athletes participated across six events in biathlon. The biathlon events consisted of a skiing a specific course multiple times depending on the length of the competition, with intermediate shooting at various positions. For every shot missed, a penalty of one minute is applied in individual events, and the participant is required to ski through a penalty loop in sprint events.

In the men's events, debutante and flag-bearer Victor Pinzaru finished 70th in the sprint event and 85th in the individual event. In the women's events, Levtchenkova, who represented Moldova for the second consecutive Winter Games, participated in all three of the women's individual medal events. She is a Russian born athlete, who became a naturalized citizen of Moldova and won the Biathlon European Championships in 2008. In the medal events, Levtchenkova registered her best finish in the women's individual event, finishing 36th amongst the 87 participants.

| Athlete | Event | Time | Misses | Rank |
|---|---|---|---|---|
| Victor Pinzaru | Men's sprint | 27:52.6 | 1 | 70 |
| Victor Pinzaru | Men's individual | 58:42.6 | 3 | 85 |
| Natalia Levchenkova | Women's sprint | 22:18.2 | 2 | 52 |
| Natalia Levchenkova | Women's pursuit | 37:38.5 | 4 | 55 |
| Natalia Levchenkova | Women's individual | 44:34.9 | 2 | 36 |

== Cross-country skiing ==
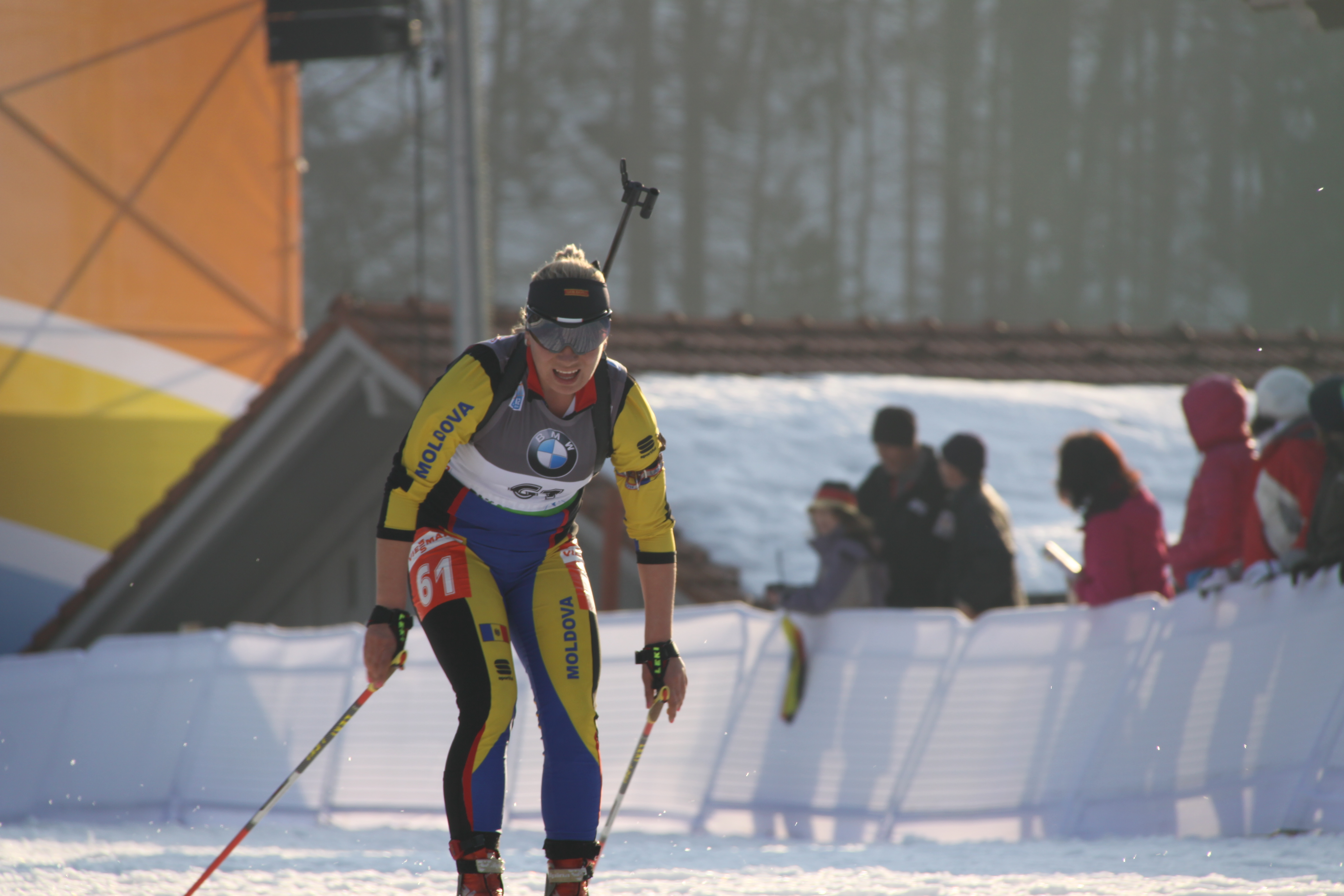
Alexandra Camenscic competed in the women's freestyle event

For the cross-country skiing event, athletes with a maximum of 300 distance points at the end of qualifying on 18 January 2010 were allowed to compete in the freestyle distance event. After a maximum quota of 20 athletes (maximum of 12 male or 12 female athletes) from a single participating NOC was reached, the remaining quotas were allocated further to athletes satisfying standard criteria from other NOCs. Sergiu Balan and Alexandra Camenscic represented the nation, and competed in the sprint events. Both of them made their debut in the Winter Olympics.

The main event was held at the Whistler Olympic Park. In the men's freestyle event, Balan completed the 15 km (9.3 mi) course in just over 42 minutes. He finished the race in 86th position (out of 96 competitors), more than eight minutes behind the winner Dario Cologna of Switzerland. In the women's freestyle event, Camenscic finished 70th amongst the 78 competitors.

| Athlete | Event | Final | | |
| Athlete | Event | Time | Deficit | Rank |
|---|---|---|---|---|
| Sergiu Balan | Men's 15 km freestyle | 42:12.1 | +8:35.8 | 86 |
| Alexandra Camenscic | Women's 10 km freestyle | 31:01.0 | +6:02.6 | 70 |

== Luge ==
The qualification for the Luge event was based on the cumulative world luge ranking points from 1 November 2009 to 31 December 2010 with a minimum requirement of having competed in five world cup events and having finished within the top 31 in any of the events. The top ranked athletes qualified directly and further qualification spots were given to nations that had athletes who met the minimum standards and had not already qualified for the event. Bogdan Macovei represented the nation, and competed in the men's singles event. This was Macovei's second appearance in the Winter Olympics, having made his debut in the previous Winter Games. He is a Romanian, who became a naturalized citizen of Moldova.

Luge events were held at the Whistler Sliding Centre from 13 to 17 February. During training on 12 February 2010, Georgian luger Nodar Kumaritashvili was killed when he crashed at the last turn and hit a steel pole when going over speeds of 143 km/h (89 mph). As a result, the start of the men's single competition was revised to reduce speed and the wall at corner where Kumaritashvili crashed was raised.

In his first run, Macovei clocked a time of 50.325 seconds, finishing nearly two seconds behind the leader Felix Loch. In the second run, he had his best run, clocking 50.175 to be ranked 32nd amongst the 39 participants. In the penultimate run, he completed the circuit with a time of 50.423 to be ranked 33rd. In the final attempt, he clocked 50.331 to finish with a total time of 3:21.354 and was classified in the 33rd position out of the 39 athletes.

| Athlete | Event | Final | | | | | |
| Athlete | Event | Run 1 | Run 2 | Run 3 | Run 4 | Total | Rank |
|---|---|---|---|---|---|---|---|
| Bogdan Macovei | Men's singles | 50.325 | 50.175 | 50.423 | 50.331 | 3:21.354 | 33 |
