= Nepal at the 2006 Winter Olympics =

- IOC code: NEP
- NOC: Nepal Olympic Committee
- Website: www.nocnepal.org.np

in Turin
- Competitors: 1 in 1 sport
- Flag bearers: Dachhiri Sherpa (opening); Kamal Chitrakar (closing)
- Medals: Gold 0 Silver 0 Bronze 0 Total 0

Winter Olympics appearances (overview)
- 2002; 2006; 2010; 2014; 2018–2026

Nepal sent a delegation to compete at the 2006 Winter Olympics in Turin, Italy, from 10 to 26 February 2006. This was Nepal's second appearance at a Winter Olympic Games, the first having been four years prior. The only athlete sent by Nepal was Dachhiri Sherpa, competing in cross-country skiing. In his only event, the men's 15 kilometre classical, he finished in 94th place.

== Background ==
Nepal first participated in Olympic competition at the 1964 Summer Olympics in Tokyo. The nation did not take part in the next Summer Olympics, but have participated in every Summer Games since the 1972 edition. Nepal did not enter the Winter Olympic Games until the 2002 Salt Lake City Olympics, these 2006 Games were their second appearance in a Winter Olympics. The only athlete sent by Nepal to the Turin Olympics was Dachhiri Sherpa, competing in cross-country skiing. He was the flag bearer for the opening ceremony while Kamal Chitrakar was the flag bearer for the closing ceremony. Chitrakar was, in 2010, a member of the executive committee of the Nepal Olympic Committee.

== Cross-country skiing ==
Dachhiri Sherpa was 36 years old at the time of the Turin Olympics. He would later go on to represent Nepal at the 2010 Winter Olympics and 2014 Winter Olympics. He only took up skiing three years prior to these Olympics. In his only event, the 15 kilometre classical, he posted a time of 56 minutes and 47 seconds, which put him in 94th place out of 96 people who finished the race.

Athlete	Event	Final	
Athlete	Event	Total	Rank
Dachhiri Sherpa	Men's 15 km classical	56:47.1	94

== See also ==
- Nepal at the 2006 Asian Games
