= Dmitry Sidorov =

Russian filmmaker (1962–2016)

- Дмитрий Сидоров
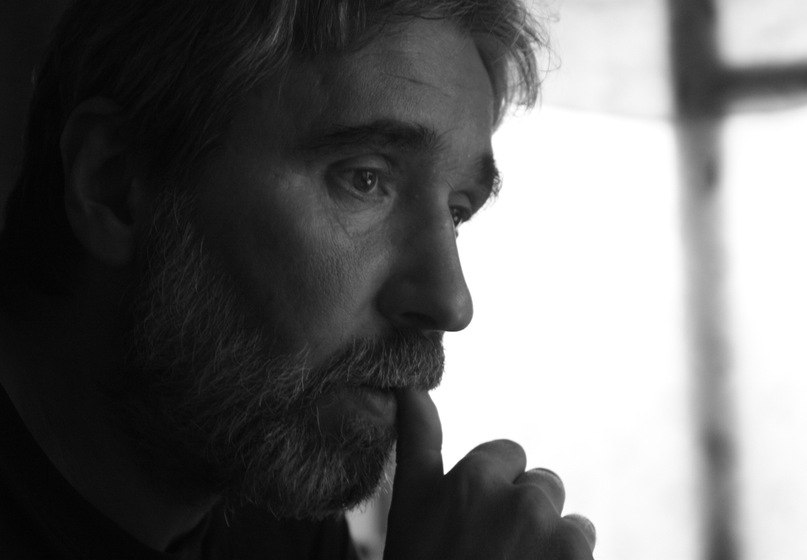
- Dmitry Sidorov (2011)
- Born: 17 May 1962; Leningrad, Soviet Union
- Died: 23 March 2016 (aged 53); Saint Petersburg, Russian Federation
- Citizenship: RU
- Education: Leningrad State University; Gerasimov Institute of Cinematography
- Occupation: Film director
- Years active: 1986–2016
- Children: Lyubov Sidorova

Dmitry Ivanovich Sidorov (Note: /ˈsiːdərɒv/ SEE-də-rov; Дмитрий Иванович Сидоров, pronounced [ˈdmʲitrʲɪj ɪvɐˈnovʲɪtɕ ˈsʲidorəf] (Note: In this name that follows East Slavic naming customs, the patronymic is Ivanovich and the family name is Sidorov.)) (17 May 1962 – 23 March 2016) was a Russian documentary film director and professor at the Saint Petersburg State Institute of Film and Television.

== Life and work ==
Dmitry Sidorov studied journalism at Leningrad State University from 1979 to 1984. From 1986 he worked first as an editor for the film journal series Soviet Russia, and since 1988 as a director at the Leningrad Documentary Film Studio (Lendoc). Among other projects, he co-wrote the treatment with Viktor Semenyuk for his documentary film The Smoke of the Fatherland (Дым отечества) about the 1988 Library of the USSR Academy of Sciences fire. In 1990 he completed postgraduate studies in film directing at the Gerasimov Institute of Cinematography.

During his time as a director at Lendoc, he created the film Clean Water (Чистая Вода, 1993, Jury Prize at the international RIENA Festival at UNESCO Paris 1994), a parable of social upheaval in Russia. The Serov Brothers (Братья Серовы, 1994) portrayed the new post-socialist generation.

From 1995 to 1999, Sidorov worked as a media expert for the EU TACIS program in the then twelve CIS states and Mongolia. Within this program more than 200 ecological video libraries were established and environmental films were broadcast on 120 television stations. Environmental issues were also reflected in his work as a filmmaker: in 1996 his film Premiere of an Annual Performance (Премьера ежегодного спектакля 1995) was awarded the “Princes’ Award” in Copenhagen as the best European environmental documentary.

Commissioned by the Hamburg Environmental Authority, in 1997 he created the film collage The Biological History (Биологическая история), a reflection on totalitarian propaganda and Soviet environmental policy.

From 1999 to 2002, Sidorov held a scholarship at the Karlsruhe University of Arts and Design and completed postgraduate studies in film and media art with Professor Hans Beller. In collaboration with experimental filmmaker Thomas Henke he created the films Die Geschichte des Joseph Wolf (2001) and Die Willingshäuser (2002). The latter is part of the permanent exhibition at the Wolfgang Bonhage Museum Korbach.

In 2003 his film The Gazes. A Phenomenlogy (Взгляды. Феноменология) premiered at DOK Leipzig. The award-winning philosophical film essay uses archival footage to show the tense relationship between the documentary camera and its subject – the filmed human being – with its moods: trust – alienation – political staging – fear – renewed trust and again fear of the violence of new mass manipulations through modern media. According to film critic Alexei Gusev, the film should obligatorily be shown in the very first class at film schools as teaching units “watch films” and “love cinema”.

From 2004 to 2015, Dmitry Sidorov was a professor at the Saint Petersburg State Institute of Film and Television. Following the master class principle, he guided two generations of documentary film directing students for five years each, from entrance examination to diploma.

Sidorov’s film In Search of Happiness (За счастьем 2015), co-directed with Svetlana Demidova, won the Pavel Kogan Prize at the Saint Petersburg documentary film festival Message to Man in 2015. The film portrays a family that had retreated to the foothills of the Caucasus almost 30 years earlier and there, initially unnoticed, is overtaken by the war in Ukraine.

In 2015, A Film About Love, a short portrait of Dmitry Sidorov directed by his student Dmitry Kalashnikov, premiered at the Swiss film festival Visions du Réel. Kalashnikov subsequently dedicated his feature-length documentary The Road Movie (2018) to Sidorov, as did another of his students, Erik Lemke, with Berlin Excelsior (2017).

== Filmography ==
=== Documentary films ===
- 1989: Budet (Будет, lit. "It Will Be")
- 1990: Prikhodyashchiye (Приходящие, lit. "Advenientes")
- 1991: Troitsa (Троица, lit. "Trinity")
- 1991: Klon (Клон, lit. "Clone")
- 1991: Pesok (Песок, lit. "Sand")
- 1992: Zoopark (Зоопарк, lit. "Zoo")
- 1992: Novgorodskaya ikona (Новгородская икона, lit. "Novgorod Icon")
- 1993: Clean Water (Chistaya voda, Чистая вода)
- 1994: Amerikanets (Американец, lit. "The American")
- 1994: The Serov Brothers (Bratya Serovy, Братья Серовы)
- 1994: Usilie (Усилие, lit. "Effort")
- 1995: 50-letie Pobedy (50-летие Победы, lit. "50th Anniversary of Victory")
- 1995: Premiere of an Annual Performance (Premyera yezhegodnogo spektaklya, Премьера ежегодного спектакля)
- 1996: Optimisty (Оптимисты, lit. "Optimists")
- 1997: The Biological History (Biologicheskaya istoriya, Биологическая история)
- 2000: Bespokoystvo (Беспокойство, lit. "Anxiety")
- 2001: Metamorphosen
- 2001: Life is very long (with Thomas Henke)
- 2001: Die Geschichte des Joseph Wolf (with Thomas Henke)
- 2002: Die Willingshäuser (with Thomas Henke)
- 2002: The Gazes. A Phenomenlogy (Vzglyady. Fenomenologiya, Взгляды. Феноменология)
- 2004: Magia mozga (Магия мозга, lit. "Magic of the Brain", four-part TV documentary)
- 2015: In Search of Happiness (Za schast'yem, За счастьем)
