= Nepal at the 2002 Winter Olympics =

- The flag of Nepal
- IOC code: NEP
- NOC: Nepal Olympic Committee
- Website: www.nocnepal.org.np

in Salt Lake City
- Competitors: 1 (man) in 1 sport
- Flag bearer: Jay Khadka
- Medals: Gold 0 Silver 0 Bronze 0 Total 0

Winter Olympics appearances (overview)
- 2002; 2006; 2010; 2014; 2018–2022; 2026

Nepal sent a delegation to compete at the 2002 Winter Olympics in Salt Lake City, United States from 8–24 February 2002. This was Nepal's first time participating in a Winter Olympic Games. The delegation consisted of a single cross-country skier, Jay Khadka. In the men's sprint he finished in 70th place, and in the men's 2 × 10 kilometre pursuit he finished in 79th place, and did not advance to the finals of either event.

== Background ==
The Nepal Olympic Committee was recognized by the International Olympic Committee on 31 December 1962. Nepal first participated in Olympic competition at the 1964 Summer Olympics in Tokyo. The nation did not take part in the next Summer Olympics, but have participated in every Summer Olympic Games since the 1972 edition. Despite this, these Salt Lake City Games were their first appearance in the Winter Olympic Games, and they have never won an Olympic medal as of 2018. The 2002 Winter Olympics were held from 8–24 February 2002; a total of 2,399 athletes took part representing 77 National Olympic Committees. The only athlete sent by Nepal to the Salt Lake Olympics was Jay Khadka, competing in cross-country skiing. He was selected as the flag bearer for the opening ceremony.

== Cross-country skiing ==
Jay Khadka was 29 years old at the time of the Salt Lake City Olympics. The Nepalese native was adopted into a British family as a young man. On 14 February, he participated in the men's 2 × 10 kilometre pursuit, which consisted of 10 kilometres of classical style racing, followed by a separate 10 kilometres of freestyle pursuit. Khadka finished the classical portion in 44 minutes and 20.3 seconds, putting him in 79th place out of 80 finishers, in a race where only the top 60 qualified to advance, and he was eliminated; the slowest qualifying time was 29 minutes and 4.6 seconds. The gold medal was shared by Frode Estil and Thomas Alsgaard of Norway, while bronze was won by Per Elofsson of Sweden. Five days later, in the men's sprint, Khadka finished the qualification round in 4 minutes and 48.42 seconds, which put him in 70th and last place, but only the top 16 were allowed to advance. The slowest qualifying time was 2 minutes and 53.87 seconds. The gold medal was won by Tor Arne Hetland of Norway, the silver was taken by Peter Schlickenrieder of Germany, and the bronze was won by Cristian Zorzi of Italy.

Sprint

Athlete	Qualifying round		Quarter finals		Semi finals		Finals	
Athlete	Time	Rank	Time	Rank	Time	Rank	Time	Final rank
Jay Khadka	4:48.42	70	did not advance					

Pursuit

Athlete	10 km C		10 km F pursuit	
Athlete	Time	Rank	Time	Final rank
Jay Khadka	44:20.3	79	did not advance	

== See also ==
- Nepal at the 2002 Asian Games
