= 2010 Winter Olympics victory ceremonies =

The Victory Ceremonies of the 2010 Winter Olympics were held between February 13 and 27, 2010 at BC Place Stadium in Vancouver, British Columbia and the Whistler Medals Plaza in Whistler, British Columbia.

Each evening began with a provincial/territorial celebration, followed by the awarding of the medals, in which each athlete stepped up to the podium to receive their medal. Each evening ended with a concert finale honouring the medalists, featuring both Canadian and international artists, including Hedley, Nelly Furtado, OneRepublic, Usher, Estelle and The All-American Rejects.

== BC Place Stadium ==
These artists performed at BC Place at night during the broadcast of the Victory Ceremonies.

Date	Artist(s)	Province's Night
February 14	Nelly Furtado	British Columbia
February 15	Gregory Charles	Quebec
February 16	Barenaked Ladies	Nova Scotia
February 17	Paul Brandt	Alberta
February 18	Hedley	Prince Edward Island
February 19	Theory of a Deadman	Northwest Territories
February 20	Stereophonics	Yukon
February 21	Trooper & Loverboy	Nunavut
February 23	Billy Talent	Saskatchewan
February 24	INXS	Ontario
February 25	Burton Cummings	Manitoba
February 26	Great Big Sea	Newfoundland and Labrador

== Whistler Medal Plaza ==
These artists performed at Whistler Medal Plaza at night during the broadcast of the Victory Ceremonies.

Date	Artist(s)
February 13	Malajube, All American Rejects
February 14	Estelle
February 15	Pierre Lapointe
February 16	Feist
February 17	Our Lady Peace
February 18	Deadmau5
February 19	Hedley
February 20	Stars
February 21	OneRepublic
February 22	Coeur de pirate, DEVO
February 23	The Fray
February 24	Jet
February 25	The Roots
February 26	K'Naan
February 27	DJ Champion, Champion and his G-Strings, Usher

== See also ==
- Sochi Medals Plaza, 2014 Winter Olympics
