= Yefim Yulyevich Uchitel =

Soviet cameraman and filmmaker

Yefim Yulyevich Uchitel (October 28, 1913 - August 18, 1988) was a Soviet cameraman, director and screenwriter of documentary films. He was a front-line cameraman during the Great Patriotic War. He got the title of People's Artist of the USSR in 1976.

== Biography ==
Uchitel was born into a Jewish family in Tiraspol. His father worked as a typesetter at a newspaper. He died in 1918, and the family became dependent on Uchitel's older brother. His older sister worked as a cashier at a movie theater, and presumably inspired Uchitel's interest in filmmaking and photography. After finishing the seventh grade, he was sent to Leningrad to study at an industrial school. Later, he worked at the brick and mechanical plant. In 1929 he joined the All-Union Leninist Young Communist League.

From 1930 to 1935, Uchitel studied at the cameraman's department of the Leningrad Institute of Film Engineers. Upon graduation, he worked as an assistant cameraman, and from 1937 he worked as a cameraman at the Leningrad studio of newsreels. During the Soviet-Finnish war he took part in filming the documentary Mannerheim Line.

From June 1941, he worked as a cameraman and director in the film group of the Leningrad Front and the 67th Army.

From 1964, he was head of the Lenkinochronik.

Throughout his career, Uchitel made more than 50 documentaries.

== Awards ==
- Medal "For the Defence of Leningrad"
- Order of the Red Star
- Order of the Patriotic War (First class)
- People's Artist of the USSR
- Vasilyev Brothers State Prize of the RSFSR
