= Peter-James Barron =

Irish cross-country skier (born 1989)

Peter-James Barron (born 31 December 1989) is an Irish cross-country skier who has competed since 2007. He finished 91st in the 15 km event at the 2010 Winter Olympics in Vancouver.

At the FIS Nordic World Ski Championships 2009 in Liberec, Barron finished 106th in the individual sprint event.

His best career finish was 13th at a 5 km event in Poland in 2007.
