= Jayaram Khadka =

Nepalese cross-country skier

Jayaram "Jay" Khadka (Nepali: जयराम खड्का) (born October 5, 1972 in Bansbari) is a Nepalese cross-country skier, who became the first Winter Olympic Athlete from Nepal. He participated in the 2002 Winter Olympics. In the Men's 1.5 km Qualification his time was 4:48.4 making him 70th place.

Khadka was born in Nepal, of the Chhetri caste. His father, a former policeman, had provided help to Richard Morley a British entrepreneur who fell ill while traveling in that country in 1984, traveling a distance that normally takes six days in three. After recovering, Morley asked the older Khadka how he could thank him; here Morley learned the other man was seriously ill, who asked Morley to take care of his son Jayaram should anything happen to him. They exchanged photos, and Morely returned to the United Kingdom.

Morley was unable to return to Nepal until five or six years later, at which time he learned the ex-policeman had died and Jayaram had moved to Bhaktapur. While dining at a restaurant in that city he was approached by a boy sweeping the establishment's floor, who asked Morley, "Are you the man who has come to rescue me?" After a second meeting, Morley decided to offer Jayaram to come live with him at his castle in the Forest of Dean. He accepted, and accompanied Morley to England December 1990.

In Britain, Jayaram experienced culture shock. As he explains, "Landing at Gatwick was like being picked up and put on Mars -- a hi-tech, completely different planet. There were things like escalators, automatic doors, strange food -- ham, red wine. I tried it and was almost sick, like drinking paraffin."

Morley had originally planned to host Jayaram for six months, but immediately changed this to three years, and eventually fought the Home Office to obtain residential status for the boy. As an experienced skier, Morley recognized his foster son was very athletic. Taking him to the French Alps, he encouraged him to take up skiing and began coaching him. At the same time Morley had founded the Nepalese Ski Association and started planning Jay’s bid to qualify for the Olympic Winter Games. When injuries prevented him from competing in Alpine skiing events, he decided to compete in cross-country in the 2002 Winter Olympics. Jayaram Khadka carried his country's flag in their first appearance at the Winter Olympics, and afterwards finished 79th in the 10 kilometer pursuit and 69th in the sprint.
