= Sergiu Balan =

Moldovan cross-country skier (born 1987)

Sergiu Balan (born 15 August 1987) is a Moldovan cross-country skier who has competed since 2006. He finished 86th in the 15 km event at the 2010 Winter Olympics in Vancouver.

Balan finished 100th in the individual sprint event at the FIS Nordic World Ski Championships 2009 in Liberec.

His best finish of 38th in a 10 km event at a lesser known event at Switzerland in 2005.
