= Lendoc =

Saint Petersburg Documentary Films Studio (Open Film Studio Lendoc)
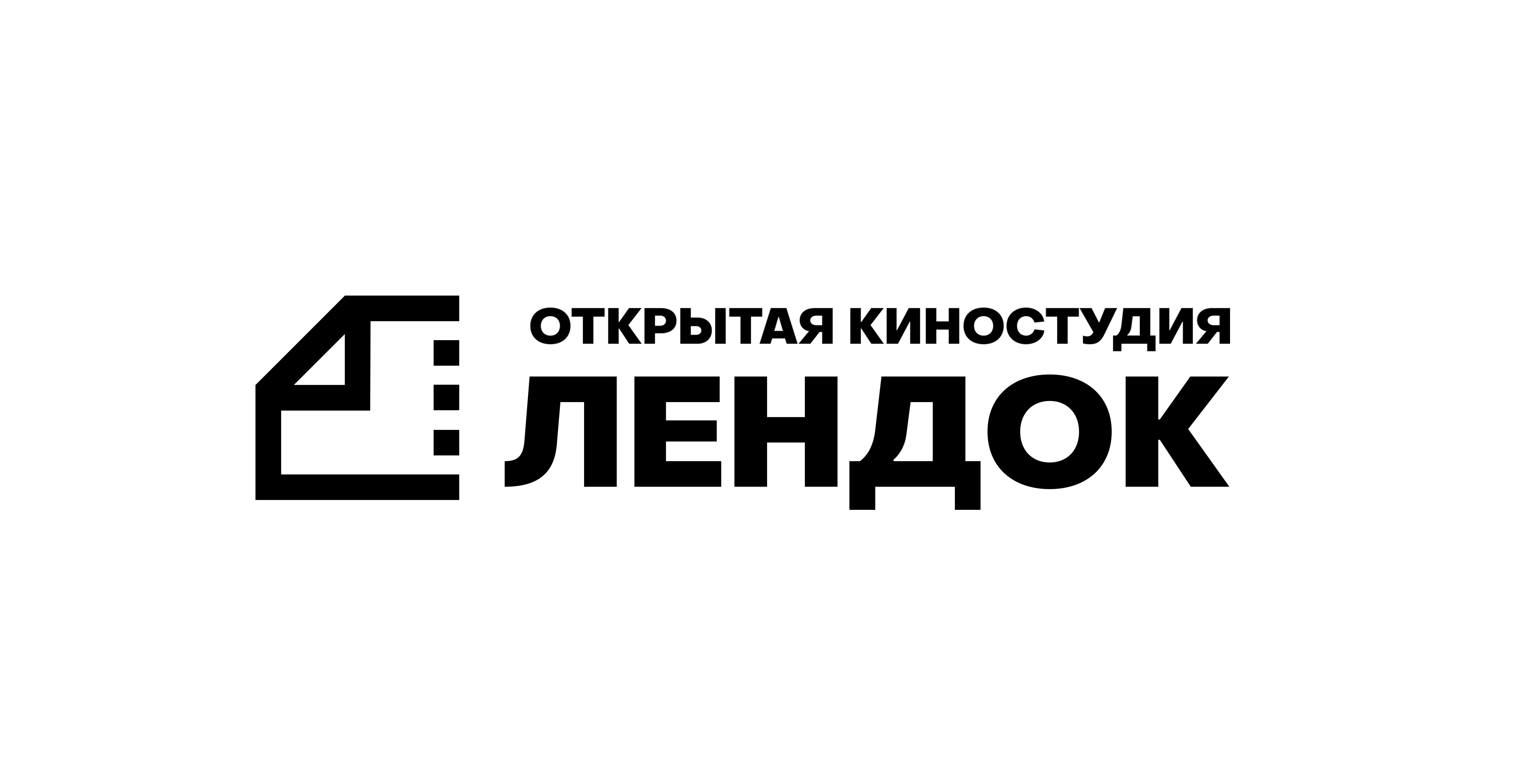
- Company type: Corporation
- Industry: Film industry
- Founded: 1932; 94 years ago
- Headquarters: Saint Petersburg, Russian Federation
- Website: lendocstudio.com

Saint Petersburg Documentary Films Studio or Lendoc (Russian: Лендок) is one of the largest documentary film studios in Russia, founded in 1932 as “Leningrad Newsreel Studio”. The studio continued to work during the Siege of Leningrad and it produced the very first documentary about the siege “Leningrad In Fight" (Ленинград в борьбе). The films produced on Lendoc have received numerous awards on Soviet and International film festivals.

Annual output through 1980-is included 40 documentaries, 9-10 newsreels, stories for the “Daily News" (Новости дня) news program and up to 50 commercials. The studio was affected by the crisis caused by the dissolution of the USSR, however it managed to overcome it and produced over 100 documentaries since 2001.

== History ==
Cinema industry was growing fast in Imperial Russia and documentaries were amongst the most popular genres: up to 70% of total films produced in the Russian Empire on the eve of WWI were documentaries.

After the Bolshevik revolution, Petrograd movie theaters and studios were nationalised and put under the management of the newly organized Petrograd Kinokomitet cinema committee. Later, two studios were created - Lenfilm and Lennauchfilm; in 1932 Lenfilm's (named Soyuzkino at the time) newsreel section was transformed into Leningrad Newsreel Studio.

Members of the Studio were awarded with the “Stalin prize” for “Mannerheim Line" (Линия Маннергейма) documentary about Winter War.

Leningrad Newsreel Studio continued to work during the Siege of Leningrad. At that time it employed several famous Soviet directors and сinematographers: Anatoliy Pogoreliy, Sergey Fomin, Yefim Uchitel, Vladimer Stradin, Nikolay Blazhkov, Evgeniy Shapiro. The studio produced over 120 films during that time.

In 1942 the studio finished the first documentary about the Siege of Leningrad “Leningrad in Fight” (Ленинград в борьбе). In 1943 Valeriy Solovtsov, Anselm Bogorov, Anatoliy Pogorelov, Vladimir Stradin and Yefim Uchitel received the “Stalin prize” for the documentary.

"Leningrad in Fight"

In 1946 the studio was moved to its current location - "house of Senator Polovtsov" on Kryukov Kanal.

In 1966 Studio employees managed to illegally film the funeral of Anna Akhmatova, any recording of which was prohibited by Soviet authorities since she was considered an unofficial leader of the dissident movement.

In 1970-s Lendoс filmed some documentaries outside of the USSR, for example, “These Restless Students” (Это беспокойное студенчество) (1974) was filmed in the US, France, West Germany, and the UK.

Some films were rejected by the Communist censorship and were premiered only after the Perestroyka and dissolution of the USSR. They included Alexander Sokurov's documentary “And nothing more” (И ничего больше) and Nikolay Obukhovich's “Our Mother is a Hero” (Наша мама - герой).

In 1998 the first album of the rock band Leningrad was recorded in the studio.

In 2013 the Lendoc creative space was opened on the studio grounds, housing a culture center, movie theater, cinema museum, and a movie school.

== Lendoc today ==
Lendoс is cooperating with European and British studios and TV channels: BBC, Channel 4, Deutsche Welle, ZDF, Yle.

In addition to the documentaries, it produces live-action movies, animation, commercials, and corporate videos.

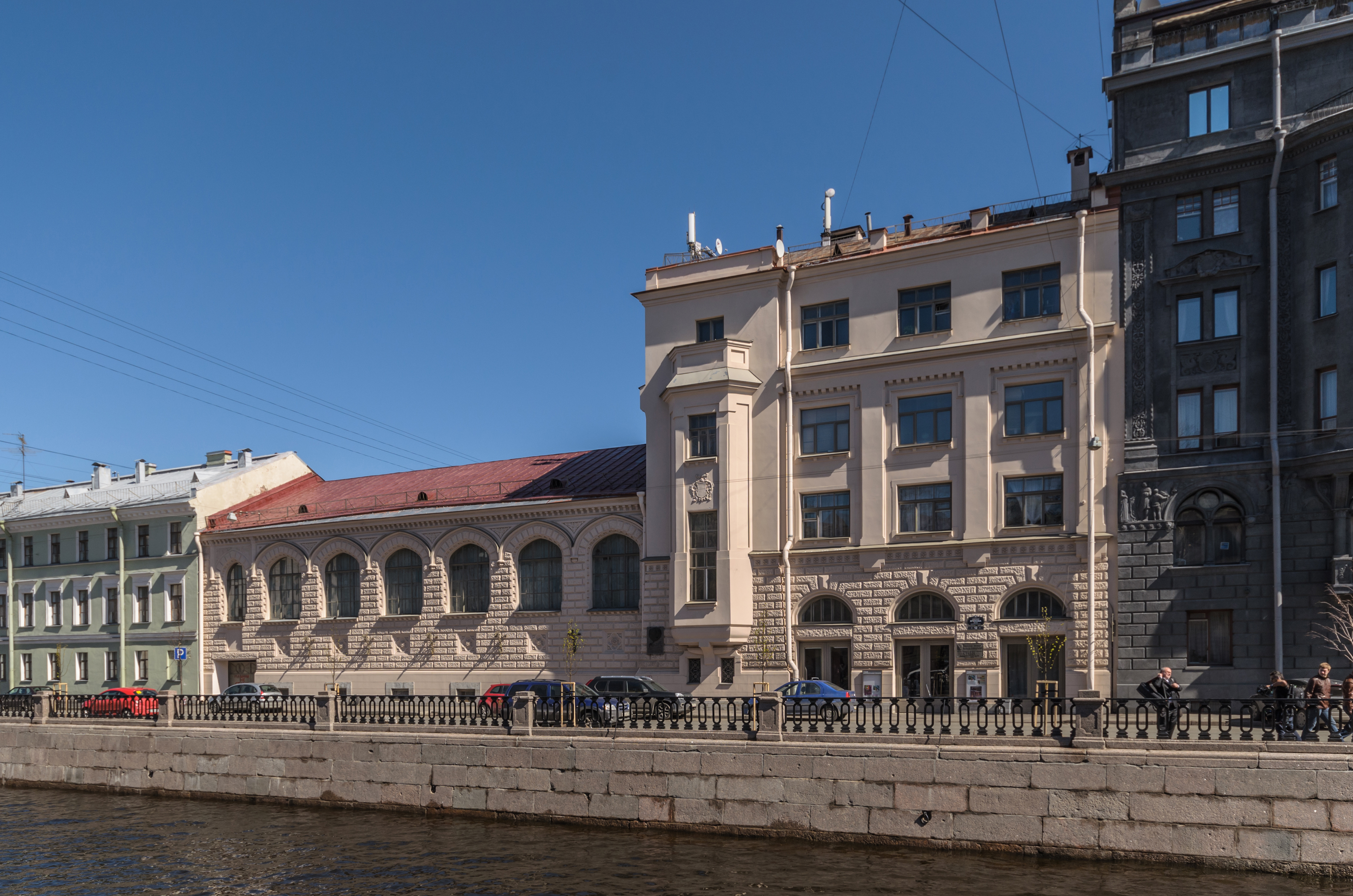
House of Senator Polovtsov, current Lendoc location

== List of the studio executives ==
List of the studio executives is composed in accordance with the records of Saint Petersburg Central State Cinema Archive

- Iosif Veneaminovich Hmelnitskiy (1932-1938);
- Vladimir Fyodorovich Orlov (1938);
- Dmitriy Aleksandrovich Dalskiy (1938-1940);
- G.S. Halipov (1940-1942);
- Valeriy Mikhailovich Solovtsov (1944-1945, 1964-1969);
- Nikolay Andrianovich Timofeev (1945-1947);
- Yakov Usherovich Nusimovich (1947);
- Andrey Rodionovich Polyakov (1947-1950, 1950-1952);
- Boris Alekseevich Medvedev (1950-1951);
- Viktor Nikolaevich Fatyanov (1952-1964);
- Valeriy Nikolaevich Ryabinskiy (1969-1996);
- Vladilen Ivanovich Kuzin (1971-1996);
- Anatoliy Victorovich Nikiforov (1996-1998);
- Vyacheslav Nikolaevich Telnov (1998-2007);
- Alexey Nikolaevich Telnov (since 2007)

== Notes ==
1. In some sources the initials are S.G.
