= 2010 Winter Olympics =

Multi-sport event in Vancouver, Canada

XXI Olympic Winter Games
- Emblem of the 2010 Winter Olympics
- Location: Vancouver, Canada
- Motto: With Glowing Hearts (French: Des plus brillants exploits)
- Nations: 82
- Athletes: 2,619 (1,586 men, 1,033 women)
- Events: 86 in 7 sports (15 disciplines)
- Opening: February 12, 2010
- Closing: February 28, 2010
- Opened by: Governor General Michaëlle Jean
- Closed by: IOC President Jacques Rogge
- Cauldron: Catriona Le May Doan; Nancy Greene; Wayne Gretzky; Steve Nash
- Stadium: BC Place Stadium

The 2010 Winter Olympics, officially known as the XXI Olympic Winter Games (French: XXI^{es} Jeux olympiques d'hiver) and also known as Vancouver 2010, were an international winter multi-sport event held from February 12 to 28, 2010 in Vancouver, Canada, with some events held in the surrounding suburbs of Richmond, West Vancouver and the University of British Columbia, and in the nearby resort town of Whistler. It was regarded by the Olympic Committee to be among the most successful Olympic games in history, in both attendance and coverage. Approximately 2,600 athletes from 82 nations participated in 86 events in fifteen disciplines. Both the Winter Olympic and Paralympic Games were organized by the Vancouver Organizing Committee (VANOC), headed by John Furlong. The 2010 Winter Games were the third Olympics to be hosted by Canada, and the first to be held within the province of British Columbia. Canada had hosted the 1976 Summer Olympics in Montreal, Quebec, and the 1988 Winter Olympics in Calgary, Alberta.

Following Olympic tradition, incumbent Vancouver mayor Sam Sullivan received the Olympic flag during the closing ceremony of the 2006 Winter Olympics in Turin, Italy. The flag was raised in a special ceremony on February 28, 2006, and was on display at Vancouver City Hall until the Vancouver opening ceremony. The event was officially opened by Governor General Michaëlle Jean, accompanied by the Canadian Prime Minister Stephen Harper and International Olympic Committee (IOC) president Jacques Rogge.

Vancouver was selected to host the 2010 Winter Olympics on July 2, 2003, at the 115th IOC Session held in Prague, Czech Republic. The final host city selection was determined by a secret ballot of the active members of the International Olympic Committee (IOC), led by the organization's President, Jacques Rogge. Vancouver secured the hosting rights in the second round of voting, narrowly defeating the bid from Pyeongchang, South Korea, by a margin of 56 to 53 votes, after Salzburg, Austria, was eliminated in the opening round.

Vancouver 2010 was immensely successful, with the official Olympic Committee press release citing "Full venues, record public attendance: Over 97% of the 1.54 million tickets available were sold, with 71% to the Canadian public at an average price of $139. Adding in international public ticket sales, the percentage of ticket sales to the public exceeds 75% of all available tickets." Vancouver 2010 also achieved record global television coverage as per the Olympic Committee, more than double the viewership of the preceding Turin 2006 games and triple the available coverage of Salt Lake City 2002, and is "recognized in numerous post Games reports as being among the most widely viewed and well received Games in Olympic history, both in Canada and internationally." Vancouver 2010's gold medal game between Canada and USA "was the most watched hockey game ever with viewership of 114 million viewers around the world."

For the first time, Canada won gold in an official sport as the host nation of the Olympics, having failed to do so in 1976 and 1988 (although Canada won the 1988 woman's curling event in Calgary when it was still only a demonstration sport). Canada clinched their first gold medal on the second day of the competition, first topping the gold medal tally on the second-to-last day of competition, and went on to become the first host nation since Norway in 1952 to lead the gold medal count. Canada broke the record for the most gold medals won at a single Winter Olympics (14), which had been set by the Soviet Union in 1976 and Norway in 2002 (13). The United States won the most medals in total, marking their second time doing so at the Winter Olympics, and broke the record for the most medals won during the Winter Games (37), a record held until then by Germany in 2002 (36). Athletes from Slovakia and Belarus won the first Winter Olympic gold medals for their nations.

== Bid and preparations ==
2010 Winter Olympics bidding results
City	Country	Round	
City	Country	1	2
Vancouver	Canada	40	56
Pyeongchang	South Korea	51	53
Salzburg	Austria	16	–

When Vancouver was bidding for the games, it proposed different dates (5-21 February for the XXI Olympic Winter Games and 5–14 March for the X Paralympic Winter Games).

The concept of a bid by Vancouver to host the Winter Olympic Games first appeared at the 1960 Games in Squaw Valley, where the Canadian representative of the International Olympic Committee (IOC) Sidney Dawes discusses the possibility of hosting a Games in British Columbia if a venue was found near Vancouver. Shortly afterwards, the Garibaldi Olympic Development Association (GODA) was created in order to prepare a bid to host the Winter Games in the region of Mount Garibaldi, near Whistler. In 1961, GODA considered developing a bid for the 1968 Winter Games, but the Canadian Olympic Committee (COC) preferred the cities of Calgary and Banff, in Alberta, as the best opportunity for a Canadian bid to succeed. Calgary's candidacy ultimately failed, and the 1968 Games were awarded to Grenoble.

A development program for the Whistler and Mount Garibaldi region was then launched to host the 1972 Games. It included the development of road infrastructure, electrical network and drinking water, which was still absent in this region. But once again, Banff was chosen to represent Canada as the potential host city for the 1972 Games, which were eventually awarded to Sapporo, Japan. In 1968, the GODA was finally chosen by the Canadian Olympic Committee with the aim of making a joint candidacy with the city of Vancouver for the organization of the 1976 Winter Olympics. However, the chances of Vancouver's candidacy dwindled when Montreal was selected to host the 1976 Summer Olympics, and the Vancouver-Garibaldi candidacy was thus eliminated in the first round of voting. Vancouver was again a candidate for the 1980 Games, but withdrew at the last moment. For the 1988 Winter Olympics, Calgary was chosen as the preferred site for the Canadian bid, and would go on to win the election and thus become the first Canadian city to host the Winter Olympics.

For the 2010 Games, the Canadian Olympic Association chose Vancouver as the Canadian candidate city over Calgary, which sought to re-host the Games, and Quebec City, which had lost the 2002 Olympic bid in 1995. On the first round of voting on November 21, 1998, Vancouver-Whistler had 26 votes, Quebec City had 25 and Calgary had 21. On December 3, 1998, the second and final round of voting occurred between the two leading contenders, which saw Vancouver win with 40 votes compared to Quebec City's 32 votes. Vancouver had also bid for the 1976 games, which were first awarded to Denver, then to Innsbruck and the 1980 games, which were awarded to Lake Placid.

After the bribery scandal over the candidacy of the Salt Lake City bid for the 2002 Winter Olympics (which resulted in Quebec City asking for compensation (C$8 million) for its unsuccessful bid), many of the rules of the bidding process were changed in 1999. The International Olympic Committee (IOC) created the Evaluation Commission, which was appointed on October 24, 2002. Prior to the bidding for the 2008 Summer Olympics, host cities would often fly members of the IOC to their city where they toured the city and were provided with gifts. The lack of oversight and transparency often led to allegations of money for votes. Afterward, changes brought forth by the IOC bidding rules were tightened, and more focused on technical aspects of candidate cities. The team analyzed the candidate city features and provided its input back to the IOC.

Vancouver won the bid to host the Olympics by a vote of the International Olympic Committee on July 2, 2003, at the 115th IOC Session held in Prague, Czech Republic. The result was announced by IOC President Jacques Rogge. Vancouver faced two other finalists shortlisted that same February: Pyeongchang, South Korea, and Salzburg, Austria. Pyeongchang, which later won the rights of hosting both 2018 Winter Olympics and 2024 Winter Youth Olympics (as a part of the Gangwon Province) had the most votes of the three cities in the first round of voting, in which Salzburg was eliminated. In the run-off, all but two of the members who had voted for Salzburg voted for Vancouver. It was the closest vote by the IOC since Sydney, Australia beat Beijing for the 2000 Summer Olympics by two votes. Vancouver's victory came almost two years after Toronto's 2008 Summer Olympic bid was defeated by Beijing in a landslide vote.

The Vancouver Olympic Committee (VANOC) spent C$16.6 million on upgrading facilities at Cypress Mountain, which hosted the freestyle (aerials, moguls, ski cross) and snowboarding events. With the opening in February 2009 of the C$40 million Vancouver Olympic/Paralympic Centre at Hillcrest Park, which hosted curling, every sports venue for the 2010 Games was completed on time and at least one year prior to the Games.

== Financials ==
=== Operations ===
In 2004, the operational cost of the 2010 Winter Olympics was estimated to be Canadian $1.354 billion (about £828,499,787, €975,033,598 or US$1,314,307,896). As of mid-2009 it was projected to be C$1.76 billion, mostly raised from non-government sources, primarily through sponsorships and the auction of national broadcasting rights. C$580 million was the taxpayer-supported budget to construct or renovate venues throughout Vancouver and Whistler. A final audit conducted by PricewaterhouseCoopers released in December 2010 revealed total operation cost to have been $1.84 billion and came in on budget resulting in neither surplus nor deficit. Construction of venues also came on budget with a total cost of $603 million.

PricewaterhouseCoopers' study estimated a total contribution to the BC economy of $2.3 billion of Gross Domestic Product, and as well creating 45,000 jobs and contributing an additional $463 million to the tourism industry while venue construction by VANOC and 3rd parties added $1.22 billion to the economy, far short of the $10 billion forecast by Premier Gordon Campbell. The study also said that hosting the Olympics was one of many reasons why the provincial debt grew by $24 billion during the decade. Indirect Olympic Games costs (e.g. expanded rail network, highways, security, paid time off for government employees "volunteering" etc.) totalled in excess of 7 billion. In 2011, the provincial auditor-general declined to conduct a post-Games audit.

=== Security costs ===
C$200 million was expected to be spent for security, which was organized through a special body, the Integrated Security Unit, of which the Royal Canadian Mounted Police (RCMP) was the lead agency; other government agencies such as the Vancouver Police Department, Canada Border Services Agency, Canadian Forces, and police agencies across Canada. The Canadian Security Intelligence Service (CSIS) also played a role. That number was later revealed to be in the region of C$1 billion, an amount in excess of five times what was originally estimated.

== Venues ==
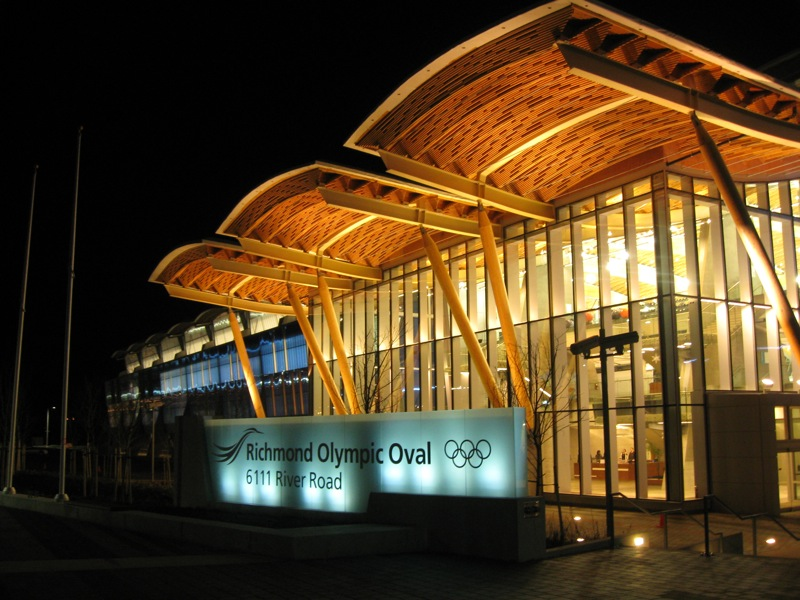
Richmond Olympic Oval: speed skating long track venue

Some venues, including the Richmond Olympic Oval, were at sea level, a rarity for the Winter Games. The 2010 Games were also the first—Winter or Summer—to have had an Opening Ceremony held indoors. Greater Vancouver was the most populous metropolitan area ever to hold the Winter Games. In February, the month when the Games were held, Vancouver has an average temperature of 4.8 °C (40.6 °F). The average temperature as measured at Vancouver International Airport was 7.1 °C (44.8 °F) for the month of February 2010.

The opening and closing ceremonies were held at BC Place Stadium, which received over C$150 million in major renovations. Competition venues in Greater Vancouver included the Pacific Coliseum, the Vancouver Olympic/Paralympic Centre, the UBC Winter Sports Centre, the Richmond Olympic Oval and Cypress Mountain. GM Place, now known as Rogers Arena, played host to ice hockey events, being renamed Canada Hockey Place for the duration of the Games since corporate sponsorship is not allowed for an Olympic venue. Renovations included the removal of advertising from the ice surface and conversion of some seating to accommodate the media. The 2010 Winter Olympics marked the first time an Olympic hockey game was played on a rink sized according to NHL rules instead of international specifications. Competition venues in Whistler included Whistler Creekside at the Whistler Blackcomb ski resort, the Whistler Olympic Park, the Whistler Celebration Plaza and the Whistler Sliding Centre.

The 2010 Winter Games marked the first time that the energy consumption of the Olympic venues was tracked in real time and made available to the public. Energy data was collected from the metering and building automation systems of nine of the Olympic venues and was displayed online through the Venue Energy Tracker project.

== Media coverage ==
The Olympic Games in Vancouver were broadcast worldwide by a number of television broadcasters. As rights for the 2010 Games have been packaged with those for the 2012 Summer Olympics, broadcasters were largely identical for both events.

The host broadcaster was Olympic Broadcasting Services Vancouver, a subsidiary of the IOC's new in-house broadcasting unit Olympic Broadcasting Services (OBS). The 2010 Olympics marked the first Games where the host broadcasting facilities were provided solely by OBS. The executive director of Olympic Broadcasting Services Vancouver was Nancy Lee, a former producer and executive for CBC Sports. The official broadcast theme was a piece called "City of Ice" composed by Rob May and Simon Hill.

In Canada, the Games were the first Olympic Games broadcast by a new Olympic Broadcast Media Consortium led by CTVglobemedia and Rogers Media, displacing previous broadcaster CBC Sports. Main English-language coverage was shown on the CTV Television Network, while supplementary programming was mainly shown on TSN and Rogers Sportsnet. Main French-language coverage was shown on V and RDS.

NBC Universal networks televised the 2010 Winter Olympics in the United States, under a contract in which it paid US$2.2 billion for the rights to the Games and the 2012 Summer Olympics. Advertising sales had slowed in comparison to previous Olympics due to the ongoing recession, and NBC projected a financial loss upwards of $250 million on the Games. Due to the growth of social media, NBC faced particular criticism for its traditional practice of tape delaying network coverage of the Olympics for the west coast—a practice that was made more egregious by the fact that these Games took place at sites within the Pacific Time Zone. In April 2010, the network reported a financial loss of $233 million on the Games.

The Associated Press (AP) announced that it would send 120 reporters, photographers, editors and videographers to cover the Games on behalf of the country's news media. The cost of their Olympics coverage prompted AP to make a "real departure for the wire service's online coverage". Rather than simply providing content, it partnered with more than 900 newspapers and broadcasters who split the ad revenue generated from an AP-produced multi-media package of video, photos, statistics, stories and a daily Webcast. AP's coverage included a microsite with web widgets facilitating integration with social networking and bookmarking services.

In France, the Games were covered by France Télévisions, which included continuous live coverage on its website.

== Torch relay ==
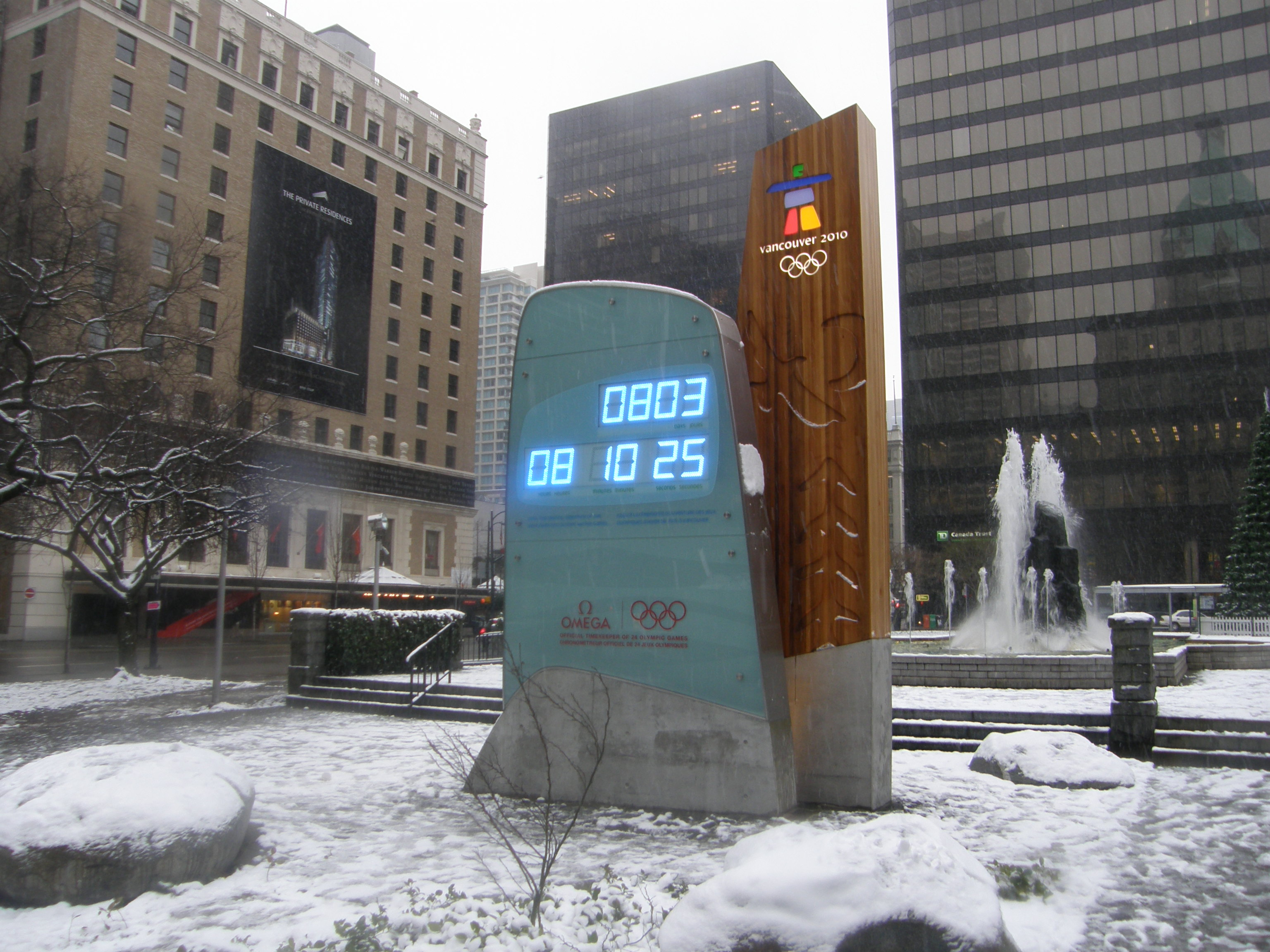
The clock counting down to the opening of the Olympic Games in Downtown Vancouver

The Olympic Torch Relay is the transfer of the Olympic flame from Ancient Olympia, Greece — where the first Olympic Games were held thousands of years ago — to the stadium of the city hosting the current Olympic Games. The flame arrives just in time for the Opening Ceremony.

For the Vancouver 2010 Olympic Winter Games, the flame was lit in Olympia on October 22, 2009. It then traveled from Greece, over the North Pole to Canada's High Arctic and on to the West Coast and Vancouver. The relay started its long Canada journey from the British Columbia capital of Victoria. In Canada, the torch traveled approximately 45,000 kilometres (28,000 mi) over 106 days, making it the longest relay route within one country in Olympic history. The Olympic Torch was carried by approximately 12,000 Canadians and reached over 1,000 communities.

Celebrity torchbearers included Arnold Schwarzenegger, Steve Nash, Matt Lauer, Justin Morneau, Michael Bublé, Bob Costas, Shania Twain, and hockey greats including Sidney Crosby, Wayne Gretzky, and the captains of the two Vancouver Canucks teams that went to the Stanley Cup Final: Trevor Linden (1994) and Stan Smyl (1982).

== The Games ==
=== Participating National Olympic Committees ===
82 National Olympic Committees (NOC) entered teams in the 2010 Winter Olympics. Cayman Islands, Colombia, Ghana, Montenegro, Pakistan, Peru and Serbia made their winter Olympic debuts. Morocco returned to the Winter games after an 18-year absence, and Jamaica and Mexico returned after 8 years. Seven countries, Costa Rica, Kenya, Luxembourg, Madagascar, Thailand, Venezuela and the Virgin Islands which were at the 2006 Games, did not participate in 2010.

Tonga sought to make its Winter Olympic debut by entering a single competitor in luge, attracting some media attention, but he crashed in the final round of qualifying. Luxembourg qualified two athletes but did not participate because one did not reach the criteria set by the NOC and the other was injured before the Games. The Philippines also sought to qualify three athletes, one in figure skating pairs and a single one in snowboarding, but failed to make the qualifying standards. Below is a map of the participating nations and a list of the nations with the number of competitors indicated in brackets.

2010 Winter Olympics Participants

Participating National Olympic Committees
- Albania (1)
- Algeria (1)
- Andorra (6)
- Argentina (7)
- Armenia (4)
- Australia (40)
- Austria (80)
- Azerbaijan (2)
- Belarus (50)
- Belgium (8)
- Bermuda (1)
- Bosnia and Herzegovina (5)
- Brazil (5)
- Bulgaria (19)
- Canada (201) (host)
- Cayman Islands (1)
- Chile (3)
- China (94)
- Chinese Taipei (1)
- Colombia (1)
- Croatia (19)
- Cyprus (2)
- Czech Republic (92)
- Denmark (18)
- Estonia (30)
- Ethiopia (1)
- Finland (95)
- France (108)
- Georgia (8)
- Germany (153)
- Ghana (1)
- Great Britain (50)
- Greece (7)
- Hong Kong (1)
- Hungary (16)
- Iceland (4)
- India (3)
- Iran (4)
- Ireland (6)
- Israel (3)
- Italy (114)
- Jamaica (1)
- Japan (94)
- Kazakhstan (37)
- Kyrgyzstan (2)
- Latvia (58)
- Lebanon (3)
- Liechtenstein (7)
- Lithuania (6)
- Macedonia (3)
- Mexico (1)
- Moldova (7)
- Monaco (3)
- Mongolia (2)
- Montenegro (1)
- Morocco (1)
- Nepal (1)
- Netherlands (34)
- New Zealand (16)
- North Korea (2)
- Norway (99)
- Pakistan (1)
- Peru (3)
- Poland (47)
- Portugal (1)
- Romania (29)
- Russia (177)
- San Marino (1)
- Senegal (1)
- Serbia (10)
- Slovakia (73)
- Slovenia (47)
- South Africa (2)
- South Korea (46)
- Spain (18)
- Sweden (106)
- Switzerland (146)
- Tajikistan (1)
- Turkey (5)
- Ukraine (47)
- United States (212)
- Uzbekistan (3)

=== Number of athletes by National Olympic Committee ===
2,626 athletes from 82 NOCs participated in the 2010 Winter Olympics.

IOC Letter Code	Country	Athletes
USA	United States	212
CAN	Canada	201
RUS	Russia	177
GER	Germany	153
SUI	Switzerland	146
ITA	Italy	114
FRA	France	108
SWE	Sweden	106
NOR	Norway	99
FIN	Finland	95
CHN	China	94
JPN	Japan	94
CZE	Czech Republic	92
AUT	Austria	80
SVK	Slovakia	73
LAT	Latvia	58
BLR	Belarus	50
GBR	Great Britain	50
POL	Poland	47
SLO	Slovenia	47
UKR	Ukraine	47
KOR	South Korea	46
AUS	Australia	40
KAZ	Kazakhstan	37
NED	Netherlands	34
EST	Estonia	30
ROU	Romania	29
BUL	Bulgaria	19
CRO	Croatia	19
DEN	Denmark	18
ESP	Spain	18
HUN	Hungary	16
NZL	New Zealand	16
SRB	Serbia	10
BEL	Belgium	8
ARG	Argentina	7
GRE	Greece	7
LIE	Liechtenstein	7
MDA	Moldova	7
AND	Andorra	6
GEO	Georgia	6
IRL	Ireland	6
LTU	Lithuania	6
BIH	Bosnia and Herzegovina	5
BRA	Brazil	5
TUR	Turkey	5
ARM	Armenia	4
ISL	Iceland	4
IRI	Iran	4
CHI	Chile	3
IND	India	3
ISR	Israel	3
LIB	Lebanon	3
MKD	Macedonia	3
MON	Monaco	3
PER	Peru	3
UZB	Uzbekistan	3
AZE	Azerbaijan	2
CYP	Cyprus	2
PRK	North Korea	2
KGZ	Kyrgyzstan	2
MGL	Mongolia	2
RSA	South Africa	2
ALB	Albania	1
ALG	Algeria	1
BER	Bermuda	1
CAY	Cayman Islands	1
TPE	Chinese Taipei	1
COL	Colombia	1
ETH	Ethiopia	1
GHA	Ghana	1
HKG	Hong Kong	1
JAM	Jamaica	1
MEX	Mexico	1
MNE	Montenegro	1
MAR	Morocco	1
NEP	Nepal	1
PAK	Pakistan	1
POR	Portugal	1
SMR	San Marino	1
SEN	Senegal	1
TJK	Tajikistan	1

=== Sports ===
The 2010 Winter Olympics featured 86 medal events over 15 disciplines in 7 sports.

- Alpine skiing (10)
- Biathlon (10)
- Bobsleigh (3)
- Cross-country skiing (12)
- Curling (2)
- Figure skating (4)
- Freestyle skiing (6)
- Ice hockey (2)
- Luge (3)
- Nordic combined (3)
- Short track speed skating (8)
- Skeleton (2)
- Ski jumping (3)
- Snowboarding (6)
- Speed skating (12)

Numbers in parentheses indicate the number of medal events contested in each separate discipline.

The opening and closing ceremonies and the events categorized as ice sports (excluding bobsleigh, luge and skeleton) were held in Vancouver and Richmond. The sports categorized as "Nordic events" were held in the Callaghan Valley located just to the west of Whistler. All alpine skiing events were held on Whistler Mountain (Creekside) and sliding events (bobsleigh, luge and skeleton) were held on Blackcomb Mountain. Cypress Mountain (located in Cypress Provincial Park in West Vancouver) hosted the freestyle skiing (aerials, moguls and ski cross), and all snowboard events (half-pipe, parallel giant slalom, snowboard cross).

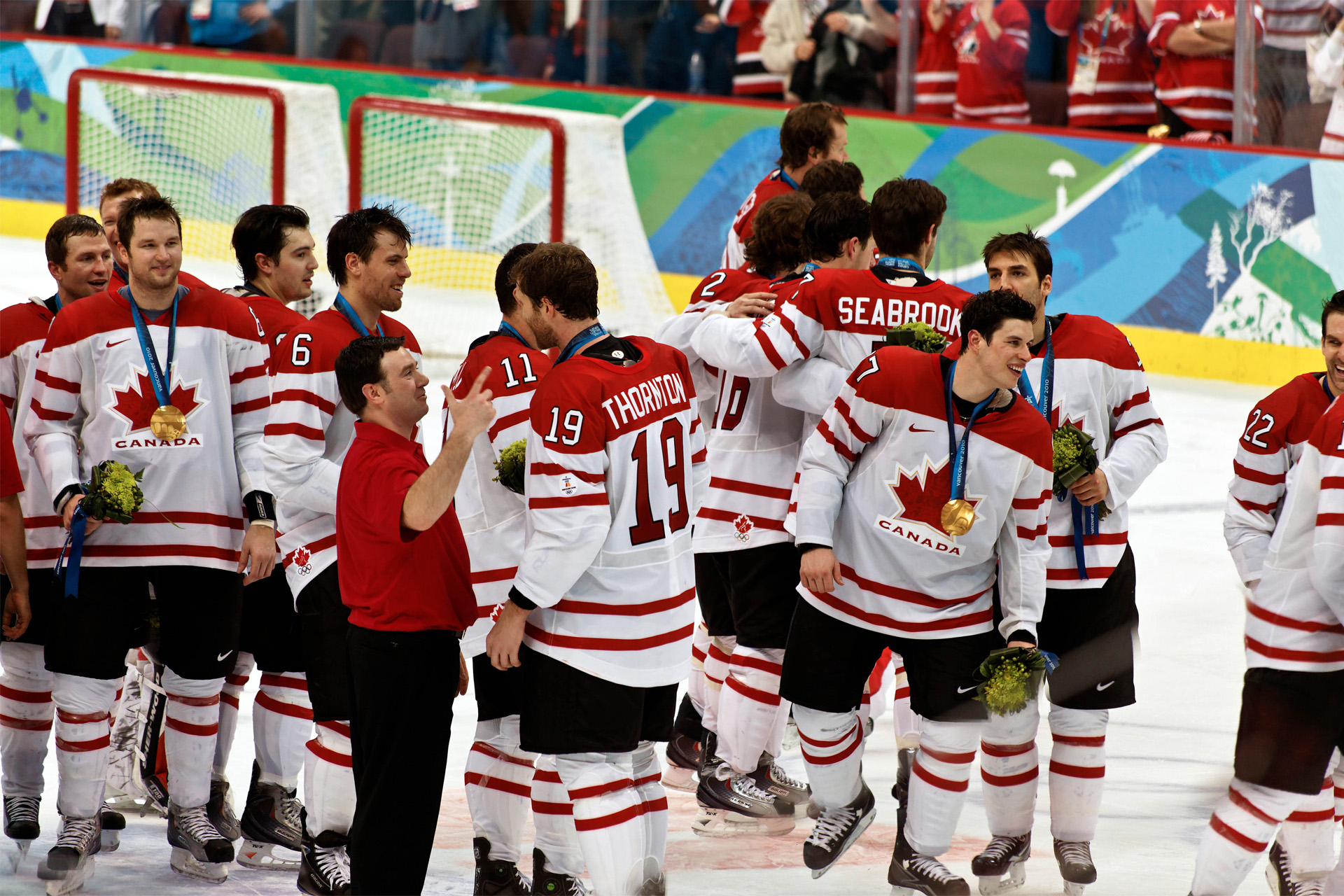
Sidney Crosby celebrates moments after scoring the gold medal-winning goal over the United States.

Vancouver 2010 was also the first winter Olympics in which both men's and women's hockey were played on a narrower, NHL-sized ice rink, measuring 200 ft × 85 ft (61 m × 26 m), instead of the international size of 200 ft × 98.5 ft (61.0 m × 30.0 m). The games were played at General Motors Place (now Rogers Arena), home of the NHL's Vancouver Canucks, which was temporarily renamed Canada Hockey Place for the duration of the Olympics. Utilizing this existing venue instead of building a new international-sized ice rink facility saved C$10 million in construction costs and allowed an additional 35,000 spectators to attend Olympic hockey games. However, some European countries expressed concern over this decision, worried that it might give North American players an advantage since they grew up playing on the smaller NHL-sized rinks. By contrast, the only other NHL venue to host Olympic hockey, the Calgary Flames' Olympic Saddledome, started construction before Calgary won the bid for the 1988 Winter Olympics and it was designed to accommodate an international ice rink.

There were a number of events that were proposed to be included in the 2010 Winter Olympics. On November 28, 2006, the IOC Executive Board at their meeting in Kuwait voted to include ski cross in the official program. The Vancouver Olympic Committee (VANOC) subsequently approved the event to officially be part of the Games program.

Events proposed for inclusion but ultimately rejected included:

- Biathlon mixed relay
- Mixed doubles curling
- Team alpine skiing
- Team bobsled and skeleton
- Team luge
- Women's ski jumping

The issue over women's ski jumping being excluded ended up in the Supreme Court of British Columbia in Vancouver during April 21–24, 2009, with a verdict on July 10 excluding women's ski jumping from the 2010 Games. A request to appeal that verdict to the Supreme Court of Canada was subsequently denied on December 22 – a decision that marked the end of any hopes that the event would be held during Vancouver 2010. To alleviate the exclusion, VANOC organizers invited women from all over Canada to participate at Whistler Olympic Park, including Continental Cup in January 2009. Women's ski jumping was included in the 2014 Winter Olympics in Sochi, Russia.

=== Calendar ===
All times are in Pacific Standard Time (UTC-8)

In the following calendar for the 2010 Winter Olympic Games, each blue box indicates that an event competition, such as a qualification round, was held on that day. The yellow boxes represent days during which medal-awarding finals for a sport were held with the number in these boxes representing the number of finals that were contested on that day.

OC	Opening ceremony	●	Event competitions	1	Event finals	EG	Exhibition gala	CC	Closing ceremony

February	12th Fri	13th Sat	14th Sun	15th Mon	16th Tue	17th Wed	18th Thu	19th Fri	20th Sat	21st Sun	22nd Mon	23rd Tue	24th Wed	25th Thu	26th Fri	27th Sat	28th Sun	Events
Ceremonies	OC																CC	—N/a
Alpine skiing				1		1	1	1	1	1		1	●	1	1	1		10
Biathlon		1	1		2		2			2		1			1			10
Bobsleigh									●	1		●	1		●	1		3
Cross country skiing				2		2		1	1		2		1	1		1	1	12
Curling					●	●	●	●	●	●	●	●	●	●	1	1		2
Figure skating			●	1	●		1	●		●	1	●		1		EG		4
Freestyle skiing		1	1						●	1	●	1	1	1				6
Ice hockey		●	●	●	●	●	●	●	●	●	●	●	●	1	●	●	1	2
Luge		●	1	●	1	1												3
Nordic combined			1									1		1				3
Short track speed skating		1				1			2				1		3			8
Skeleton							●	2										2
Ski jumping	●	1						●	1		1							3
Snowboarding				1	1	1	1								1	1		6
Speed skating		1	1	1	1	1	1		1	1		1	1		●	2		12
Daily medal events		5	5	6	5	7	6	4	6	6	4	5	5	6	7	7	2	86
Cumulative total		5	10	16	21	28	34	38	44	50	54	59	64	70	77	84	86	86
February	12th Fri	13th Sat	14th Sun	15th Mon	16th Tue	17th Wed	18th Thu	19th Fri	20th Sat	21st Sun	22nd Mon	23rd Tue	24th Wed	25th Thu	26th Fri	27th Sat	28th Sun	Total events

== Medal table ==
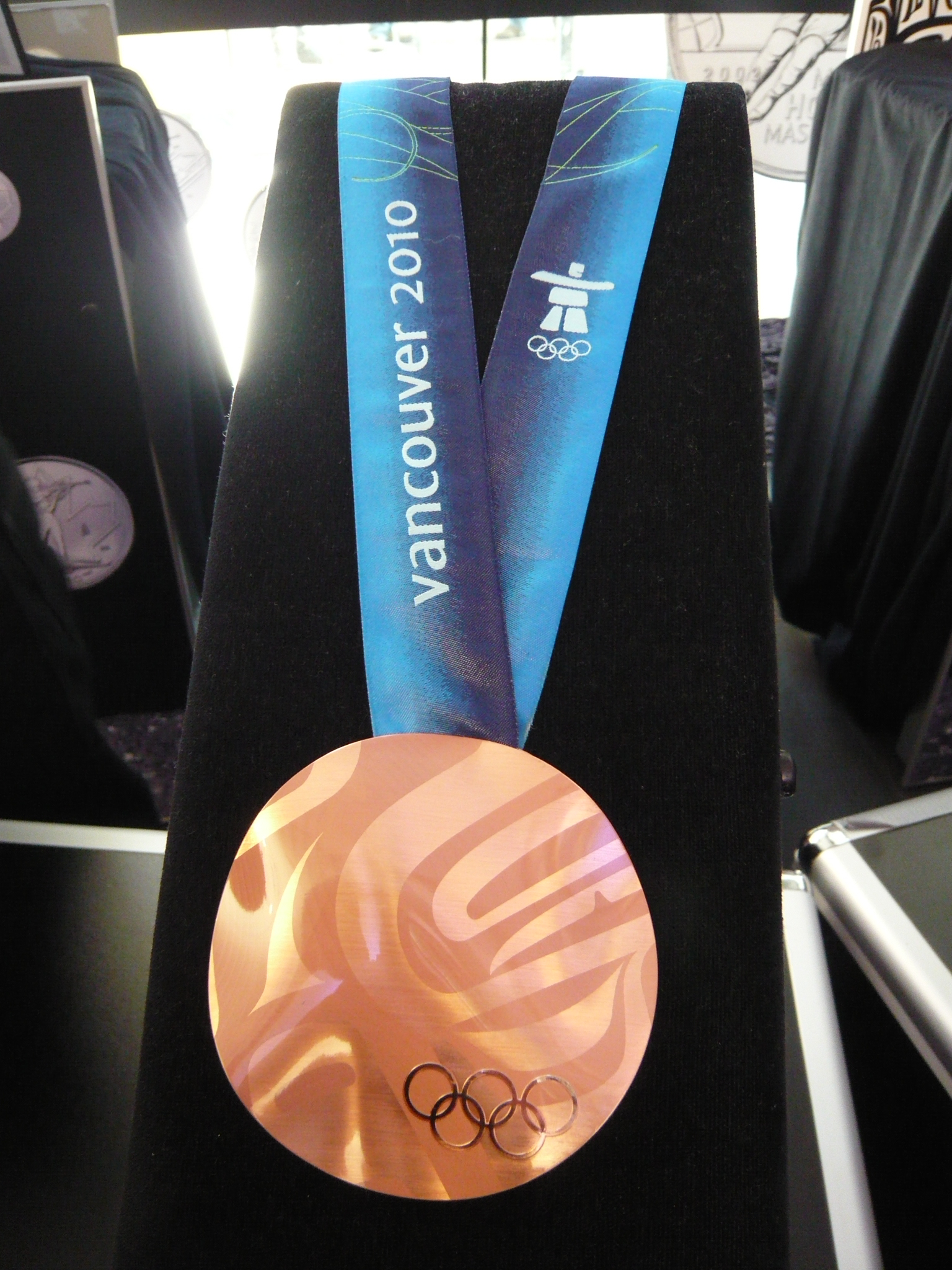
Bronze Medal of 2010 Winter Olympics

The top ten listed NOCs by number of gold medals are listed below. The host nation, Canada, is highlighted.

Host country (Canada)

To sort this table by nation, total medal count, or any other column, click on the icon next to the column title.

Rank	Nation	Gold	Silver	Bronze	Total
1	Canada*	14	7	5	26
2	Germany	10	13	7	30
3	United States	9	15	13	37
4	Norway	9	8	6	23
5	South Korea	6	6	2	14
6	Switzerland	6	0	3	9
7	Sweden	5	2	5	12
8	China	5	2	4	11
9	Austria	4	6	6	16
10	Netherlands	4	1	3	8
Totals (10 entries)		72	60	54	186

== Concerns and controversies ==
Some in the foreign press, including London 2012 organizers, had criticized the lack of city decorations to acknowledge that Vancouver was the host of the Games. The original plans to decorate the city in Olympic colours, a tradition followed by other recent Games host cities, were canceled for several reasons. Anti-Games activists repeatedly vandalized the existing 2010 Olympics monuments such as the countdown clock, forcing the city to install CCTV cameras, and adding more Games decorations would have inevitably required more security presence to deter protesters, so VANOC opted to minimize these symbols to avoid making the city a police state. Besides local opposition, budget cutbacks also forced the organizers to scale back on the elaborate plans.

VANOC initially benefited from an economic boom and was able to secure lucrative and record domestic sponsorships, but this boom also resulted in rapidly rising construction and labour costs. Due to these factors, as well as the Great Recession, VANOC built minimalistic functional venues with little aesthetic appeal though they were well-designed for post-Games usage. This approach, as well as the fact that most of the infrastructure already existed, meant that the direct costs of the Vancouver Games were much lower than recent Olympic games.

Before the Games began and as they commenced, a number of concerns and controversies surfaced and received media attention. Hours before the opening ceremony, Georgian luger Nodar Kumaritashvili was killed during a training run after being thrown out from his luge, intensifying questions about the safety of the course and prompting organizers to implement quick modifications. Immediately after the accident, officials attributed it to an athlete error rather than a track deficiency. The International Luge Federation called an emergency meeting after the accident, and all other training runs were cancelled for the day. The President of Georgia, Mikheil Saakashvili, thanked the hosts for the way that they handled Kumaritashvili's death which included a moment of silence, bringing his remains back to Georgia and a tribute to him at the opening ceremony.

One critic questioned the choice of Cypress Mountain as a venue because of its potential lack of snow due to the 2009-10 El Niño. Because of this possibility, organizers had a contingency plan to truck in snow from Manning Park, about 250 kilometres (160 mi) to the east of the city. This allowed events to proceed as planned.

Political decisions involving cancellation of promised low-income housing and the creation of a community of mixed economic backgrounds for post-Games use of the athletes' village was criticized.

Opening ceremonies were stalled while organizers dealt with mechanical problems during the cauldron lighting ceremony. Speed skating events were delayed due to breakdowns of the ice resurfacers supplied by Olympia, an official sponsor of the Games.

Thousands of tickets were voided by organizers when weather conditions made standing-room-only areas unsafe. Visitors were also upset that, as in past Olympics, medal ceremonies required separate admission and blocks of VIP tickets reserved for sponsors and dignitaries were unused at events. Other glitches and complaints have included confusion by officials at the start of the February 16 men's and women's biathlon pursuit races, and restricted access to the Olympic flame cauldron on the Vancouver waterfront.

=== Opposition ===
Opposition to the Olympic Games was expressed by activists and politicians, including Lower Mainland mayors Derek Corrigan and Richard Walton. Many of the public pre-Olympic events held in Vancouver were attended by protesters.

On Saturday, February 13, as part of a week-long Anti-Olympic Convergence, protesters smashed windows of the Downtown Vancouver location of The Hudson's Bay department store. Protesters later argued that the Hudson's Bay Company, "has been a symbol of colonial oppression for centuries" as well as a major sponsor of the 2010 Olympics.

Some of the issues reflected in the opposition continue the themes identified in opposition to all Olympic games, some of which are outlined in anti-Olympics activist and Professor of Sociology Helen Jefferson Lenskyj's books Olympic Industry Resistance (2007) and Inside the Olympic Industry (2000), which examined a number of different Olympic Games prior to the 2010 Winter Olympics. These issues of concern, underlying the opposition to any and all Olympic Games, include:

- Displacement of low-income residents.
- Anticipated human trafficking for the purpose of forced prostitution.

==== First Nations opposition ====
Although the Aboriginal governments of the Squamish, Musqueam, Lil'wat and Tsleil-Waututh (the "Four Host First Nations"), on whose traditional territory the Games were held, signed a protocol in 2004 in support of the games, there was opposition to the Olympics from some indigenous groups and supporters. Although the Lil'wat branch of the St'at'imc Nation is a co-host of the Games, a splinter group from the Seton band known as the St'at'imc of Sutikalh, who have also opposed the Cayoosh Ski Resort, feared the Olympics would bring unwanted tourism and real estate sales to their territory.

Local aboriginal people, as well as Canadian Inuit, initially expressed concern over the choice of an inukshuk as the symbol of the Games, with some Inuit leaders such as former Nunavut Commissioner Peter Irniq stating that the inukshuk is a culturally important symbol to them. He said that the "Inuit never build inuksuit with head, legs and arms. I have seen inuksuit [built] more recently, 100 years maybe by non-Inuit in Nunavut, with head, legs and arms. These are not called inuksuit. These are called inunguat, imitation of man." Local aboriginal groups also expressed annoyance that the design did not reflect the Coast Salish and Interior Salish native culture from the region the Games are being held in, but rather that of the Inuit, who are indigenous to the Arctic far from Vancouver.

=== Doping ===
On March 11, 2010, it was reported that the Polish cross country skier Kornelia Marek was tested positive for EPO by the Polish Olympic Committee. If found guilty of doping by the International Olympic Committee, Marek and the relay teams would be disqualified and stripped of their Vancouver results. She would also be banned from the next Winter Olympics in Sochi, Russia, in 2014.

Marek denied taking any banned substances, but the backup "B" sample from the Vancouver doping lab confirmed the "A" sample.

On October 9, 2017, the IOC announced that three positive doping cases had been found from their re-analysis programme from the 2010 games. All three cases belonged to the same athlete, whose identity was not released at the time. The IOC had re-tested 1,195 urine samples from the games out of the 1,710 taken, which equates to 70%, as part of their re-analysis programme. Weeks later, the athlete was confirmed to be Slovenian biathlete Teja Gregorin.

== Mascots ==
The 4 mascots of the 2010 Winter Olympics and Paralympics were Quatchi, a Sasquatch; Miga, a spirit bear—orca hybrid; Sumi, a thunderbird, orca, and black bear hybrid; and their sidekick Mukmuk, a Vancouver Island Marmot.

== Legacy ==
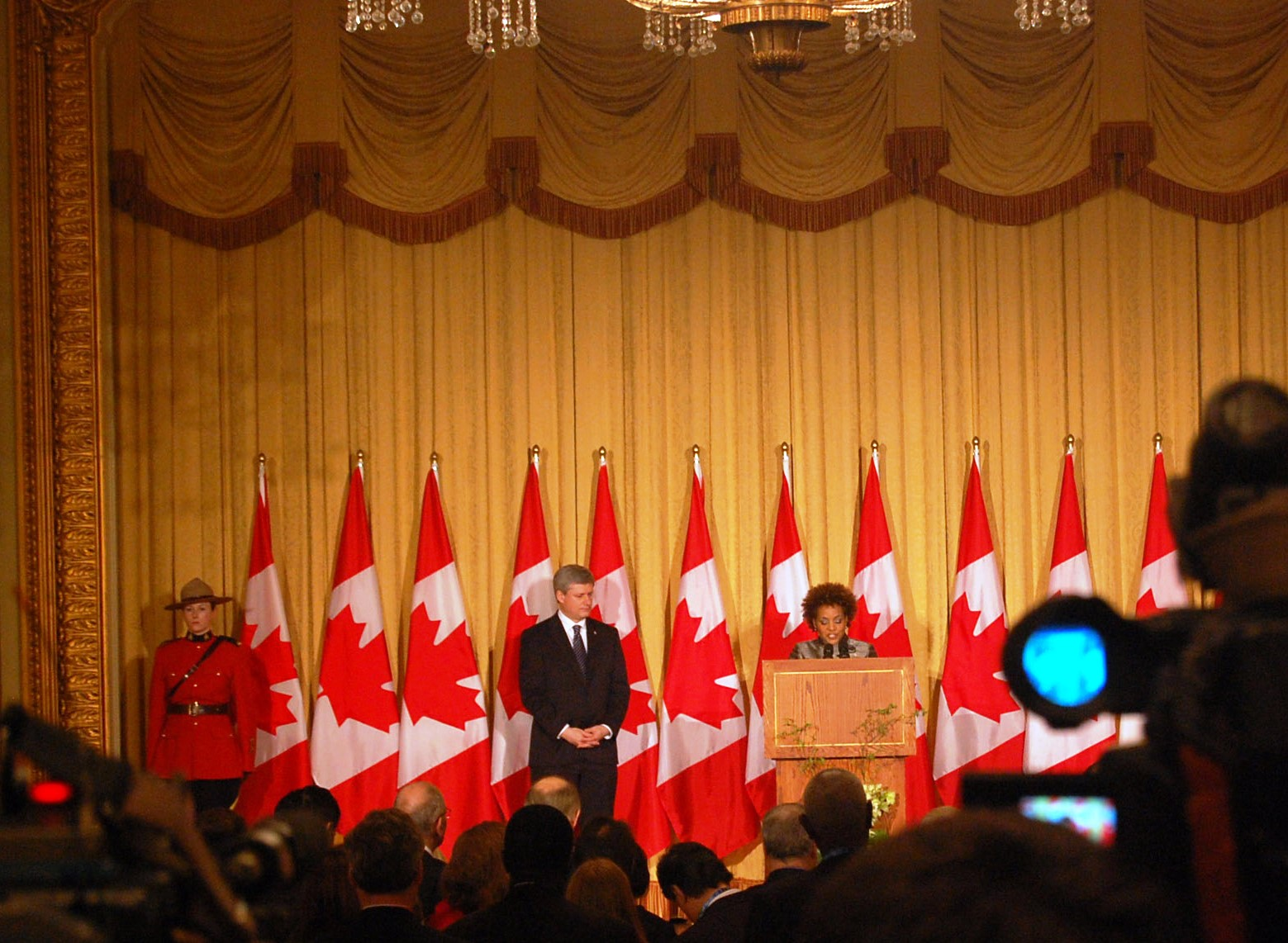
Prime Minister of Canada Stephen Harper and Governor General of Canada Michaelle Jean at the 2010 Vancouver Winter Olympic Games Heads of State Reception

The massive celebratory crowds in downtown Vancouver were highly praised by the IOC. Jacques Rogge, the president of IOC, indicated that "the way Vancouver embraced these Games was extraordinary. This is really something unique and has given a great atmosphere for these Games." The atmosphere surrounding the Olympics, and its inclusion of foreign delegates and guests, was also praised, with many seasoned Winter Olympic observers putting the games at, or near, the top of the list of best ever Winter Olympics. They were also the best watched Winter Olympics since the 1994 Olympics in Lillehammer. They are also mentioned alongside the Sydney 2000 Summer games in regards to the best atmosphere. A large part is credited to the citizens of Vancouver, British Columbia and Canada.

Some members of the media (mostly, and particularly the British media) criticized the Own the Podium and criticized the celebrations as having been somewhat nationalistic, but this was not an opinion shared by many. Some suggested that the British media were making these criticisms in order to make the upcoming 2012 Summer Olympics more appealing. Lord Sebastian Coe, chairman of the 2012 London Olympic Games Organizing Committee, attended the Vancouver Olympics to see how the city coped with the challenges of hosting. Lord Coe noted the Games had "gradually recovered from its tumultuous start" and queried that he "never thought the British would find rivals in their preoccupation with the weather which is almost elevated to an Olympic event" as he credited VANOC for meeting unforeseen challenges such as the unseasonably warm weather of Cypress Mountain. Coe added "Rarely have I seen a host city so passionate and so ready to embrace the Games".

The Vancouver Olympics also organized and hosted the first Pride House for LGBT athletes in the history of the event.

=== Funding ===
Directly as a result of Canada's medal performance at the 2010 Olympics, the Government of Canada announced in the 2010 federal budget, a new commitment of $34 million over the next two years towards programs for athletes planning to compete in future Olympics. This is in addition to the $11 million per year federal government commitment to the Own the Podium program.

Also, as a result of hosting the 2010 Olympics, the British Columbia government pledged to restore funding for sports programs and athlete development to 2008 levels, which amounts to $30 million over three years.

=== Usage of venues after the Olympic Games ===
Unlike at previous Games, all new venues were designed with their post-Games use in mind. The Richmond Olympic Oval was converted from a speed skating oval into an indoor multi-sports centre, the Hillcrest Centre is now a multi-purpose community centre with hockey rink and swimming pool and Whistler Olympic Park is used for public recreation, athlete training, and competition events.

== See also ==
- 2010 Winter Paralympics
- Olympic Games held in Canada
  - 1976 Summer Olympics – Montreal
  - 1988 Winter Olympics – Calgary
  - 2010 Winter Olympics – Vancouver
- List of IOC country codes
- 2010 Winter Olympics victory ceremonies

== Notes ==
A. Miga and Quatchi were mascots for the Olympic Games, while Sumi was the mascot for the Paralympic Games. Mukmuk is considered a sidekick, not a full mascot.

Winter Olympics
Preceded by Turin	XXI Olympic Winter Games; Vancouver; 2010	Succeeded by Sochi
