= Dachhiri Sherpa =

Nepalese cross-country skier and runner (born 1969)

Dachhiri Dawa Sherpa
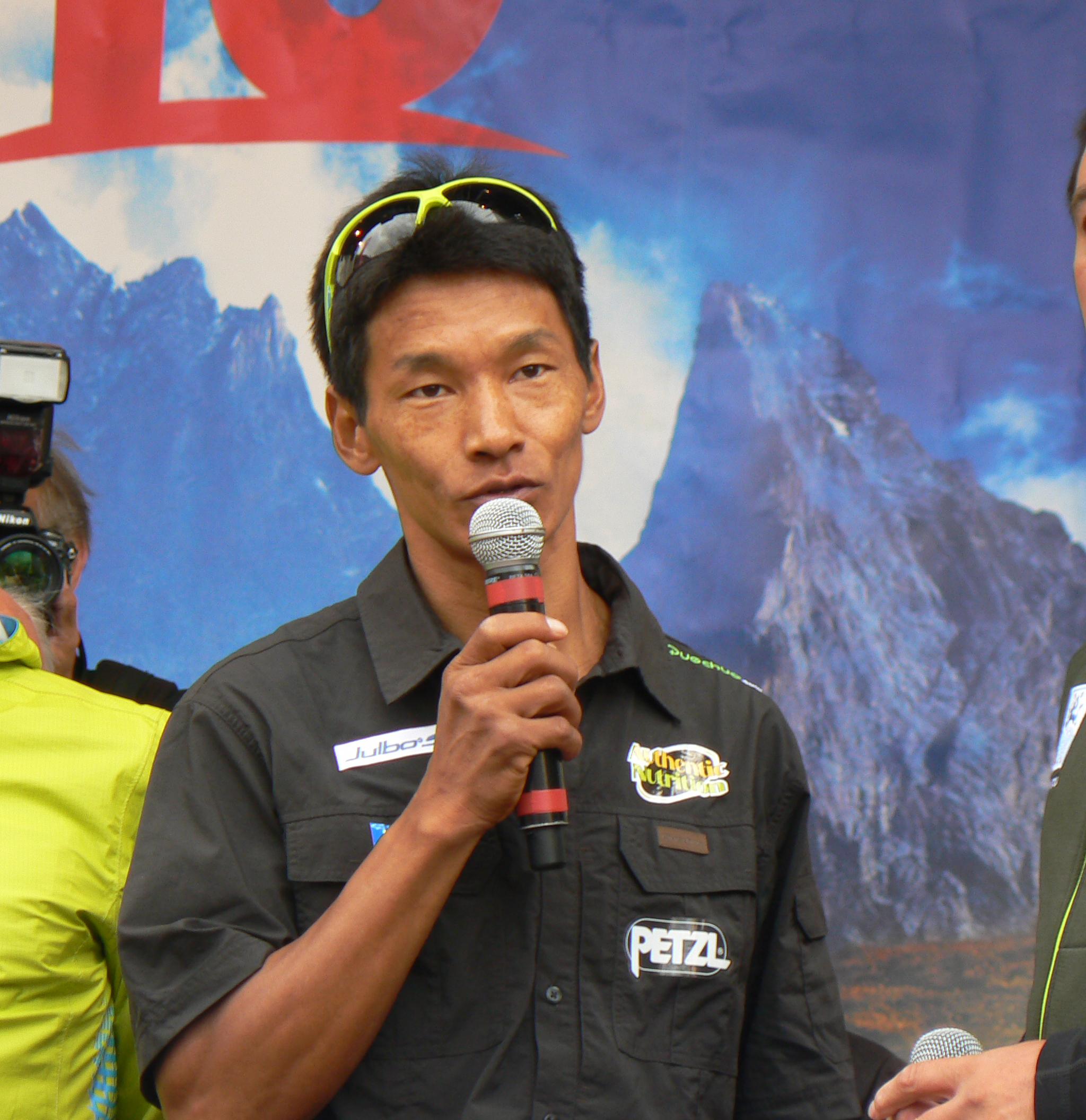
- Dachhiri Dawa Sherpa — winner of TDS -Traces des Ducs de Savoie, Ultra-Trail du Mont-Blanc 2012.
- Born: November 3, 1969 (age 56); Solukhumbu, Nepal
- Other names: Dachhiri Sherpa
- Known for: Ultramarathon, trail running, cross-country skiing

Dawa Dachhiri Sherpa (Nepali: दाछिरी शेर्पा) (born November 3, 1969) is a Nepalese cross-country skier and runner who has competed since 2003. Competing in three Winter Olympics, he earned his best finish of 86th in the 15 km event at Sochi in 2014.

== Skiing ==
At the FIS Nordic World Ski Championships 2009 in Liberec, Sherpa finished 127th in the individual sprint event while being lapped in the 30 km mixed pursuit event.

His best career finish was eighth in a 15 km event in Bulgaria in 2009.

== Ultrarunning ==
He previously held the record for the Ultra-Trail du Mont-Blanc, an ultramarathon held in the Alps, having completed the first edition of this race in 20h05m in 2003.

== Olympic Winter Games ==
Rank	Event	Location	Result
86	15 km Classic Year 2014	Sochi, RUS	55:39.3
92	15 km Free Year 2010	Vancouver, BC, CAN	44:26.5
94	15 km Classic Year 2006	Torino, ITA	56:47.1

== World Championships ==
Rank	Event	Location	Result
84	Event 15 km + 15 km Skiathlon Year 2013	Val di Fiemme, ITA	LAP
	Event Sprint Classic Year 2013	Val di Fiemme, ITA	DNS
