= Bhutan at the 2016 South Asian Games =

- IOC code: BHU
- NOC: Bhutan Olympic Committee

in Guwahati and Shillong
- Competitors: 87 in 12 sports
- Medals Ranked 8th: Gold 0 Silver 1 Bronze 15 Total 16

South Asian Games appearances (overview)
- 1984; 1985; 1987; 1989; 1991; 1993; 1995; 1999; 2004; 2006; 2010; 2016; 2019; 2025

Bhutan participated in the 2016 South Asian Games in Guwahati and Shillong in Bhutan from 5 February to 16 February 2016.

== Medal summary ==
Bhutan won 1 silver and 15 bronze medals.

=== Medal table ===
| Sport | Gold | Silver | Bronze | Total |
|---|---|---|---|---|
| Archery | 0 | 1 | 4 | 5 |
| Taekwondo | 0 | 0 | 9 | 9 |
| Boxing | 0 | 0 | 2 | 2 |
| Athletics | 0 | 0 | 0 | 0 |
| Badminton | 0 | 0 | 0 | 0 |
| Cycling | 0 | 0 | 0 | 0 |
| Field hockey | 0 | 0 | 0 | 0 |
| Football | 0 | 0 | 0 | 0 |
| Handball | 0 | 0 | 0 | 0 |
| Judo | 0 | 0 | 0 | 0 |
| Kabaddi | 0 | 0 | 0 | 0 |
| Kho-Kho | 0 | 0 | 0 | 0 |
| Shooting | 0 | 0 | 0 | 0 |
| Squash | 0 | 0 | 0 | 0 |
| Swimming | 0 | 0 | 0 | 0 |
| Table tennis | 0 | 0 | 0 | 0 |
| Tennis | 0 | 0 | 0 | 0 |
| Triathlon | 0 | 0 | 0 | 0 |
| Volleyball | 0 | 0 | 0 | 0 |
| Wrestling | 0 | 0 | 0 | 0 |
| Wushu | 0 | 0 | 0 | 0 |
| Totals (21 entries) | 0 | 1 | 15 | 16 |
