= India at the 2016 South Asian Games =

- IOC code: IND
- NOC: Indian Olympic Association

in Guwahati and Shillong
- Competitors: 519
- Flag bearers: Saurav Ghosal (In Guwahati); P. V. Sindhu (In Shilong)
- Medals Ranked 1st: Gold 188 Silver 92 Bronze 28 Total 308

South Asian Games appearances (overview)
- 1984; 1985; 1987; 1989; 1991; 1993; 1995; 1999; 2004; 2006; 2010; 2016; 2019; 2025

India participated in the 2016 South Asian Games in Guwahati and Shillong, India from 5 to 16 February 2016.

== Medal summary ==
India won 188 gold medals and a total of 308 medals.

=== Medals by sports ===
Sport	Gold	Silver	Bronze	Total
Athletics	28	22	8	58
Shooting	25	10	10	45
Swimming	23	19	3	45
Wrestling	14	2	0	16
Weightlifting	12	1	0	13
Wushu	11	2	3	16
Archery	10	4	0	14
Boxing	10	0	0	10
Judo	9	3	0	12
Badminton	7	5	0	12
Table tennis	7	5	0	12
Cycling	6	5	2	13
Tennis	5	5	0	10
Taekwondo	5	3	2	10
Squash	3	2	0	5
Triathlon	3	2	0	5
Handball	2	0	0	2
Kabaddi	2	0	0	2
Kho-Kho	2	0	0	2
Volleyball	2	0	0	2
Field hockey	1	1	0	2
Football	1	1	0	2
Totals (22 entries)	188	92	28	308

=== Medals by Date ===
Date	(gold) Gold	(silver) Silver	(bronze) Bronze	Total
6 February	14	5	0	19
7 February	16	7	3	26
8 February	23	10	1	34
9 February	25	16	4	45
10 February	40	27	7	74
11 February	20	12	3	35
12 February	6	2	3	11
13 February	9	5	4	18
14 February	4	3	1	8
15 February	26	3	2	31
16 February	5	2	0	7
Total	188	92	28	308

== Medalists ==
Medal	Name	Sport	Event	Date
Gold	Bidayuluxmi Tourangbam	Cycling	Women's 30km Individual Time Trial	6 February
Gold	Saikhom Mirabai Chanu	Weightlifting	Women's 48 Kg	6 February
Gold	Arvind Panvar	Cycling	Men's 40km Individual Time Trial	6 February
Gold	Guru Raja	Weightlifting	Men's 56 Kg	6 February
Gold	Harshdeep Kaur	Weightlifting	Women's 53 Kg	6 February
Gold	Shivani Kataria	Swimming	Women's 200m Freestyle	6 February
Gold	Sandeep Sejwal	Swimming	Men's 200m Breaststroke	6 February
Gold	Damini Gowda	Swimming	Women's 100m Butterfly	6 February
Gold	Avantika Chavan, V Malvika, Maana Patel, Shivani Kataria	Swimming	Women's 4x100m Fresstyle Relay	6 February
Gold	Priyanka Singh	Wrestling	Women's 48Kg Freestyle	6 February
Gold	Archana Tomar	Wrestling	Women's 55Kg Freestyle	6 February
Gold	Manisha	Wrestling	Women's 60Kg Freestyle	6 February
Gold	Ravindra	Wrestling	Men's 57Kg Freestyle	6 February
Gold	Rajneesh	Wrestling	Men's 65Kg Freestyle	6 February
Gold	Lidiyamol Sunny Menamparambil	Cycling	Women's 40 Km Criterium	7 February
Gold	Saraswati Raut	Weightlifting	Women's 56 Kg	7 February
Gold	Sambo Lapung	Weightlifting	Men's 69 Kg	7 February
Gold	Sandeep Sejwal	Swimming	Men's 100m Breaststroke	7 February
Gold	Sajan Prakash	Swimming	Men's 1500m Freestyle	7 February
Gold	Sayani Ghosh	Swimming	Women's 400m Individual Medley	7 February
Gold	M. Arvind	Swimming	Men's 200m Backstroke	7 February
Gold	Amit Kumar Dhankar	Wrestling	Men's 70Kg Freestyle	7 February
Gold	Pradeep	Wrestling	Men's 61Kg Freestyle	7 February
Gold	Mamata	Wrestling	Women's 53Kg Freestyle	7 February
Gold	Manisha	Wrestling	Women's 60Kg Freestyle	7 February
Gold	Ajay Singh	Weightlifting	Men's 77Kg	7 February
Gold	Y Sapna Devi	Wushu	Taolu-Changquan	7 February
Gold	Rakhi Haler	Weightlifting	Women's 69Kg	7 February
Gold	Anthony Amalraj, Sathiyan Gunasekaran, Devesh Karia, Sanil Sankar Shetty, Sudhanshu Grover	Table Tennis	Men's Team	7 February
Gold	Manika Batra, Mouma Das, Pooja Vijay Sahasrabudhe, Madhurika Patkar, Shamini Kumaresan	Table Tennis	Women's Team	7 February
Gold	Srikanth Kidambi, Ajay Jayaram, Manu Attri, Akshay Dewalkar, B. Sai Praneeth, Prannoy H. S., B. Sumeeth Reddy, Pranav Chopra	Badminton	Men's Team	8 February
Gold	P. V. Sindhu, P. C. Thulasi, Ashwini Ponnappa, Jwala Gutta, Ruthvika Gadde, K. Maneesha, N. Sikki Reddy	Badminton	Women's Team	8 February
Gold	Chaoba Devi Eangbam, Bidayuluxmi Tourangbam, G Manisha, Rutuja Satpute	Cycling	Women's 40km Team Time Trial	8 February
Gold	Manjeet Singh, Arvind Panvar, Deepak Kumar Rahi, Manohar lal Bishnoi	Cycling	Men's 70km Team Time Trial	8 February
Gold	Joshna Chinappa	Squash	Women's Singles	8 February
Gold	V Malvika	Swimming	Women's 800m Freestyle	8 February
Gold	P. S. Madhu	Swimming	Men's 100m Backstroke	8 February
Gold	Sandeep Sejwal	Swimming	50m Breaststroke	8 February
Gold	Kavita Devi	Weightlifting	Women's 75Kg	8 February
Gold	Vikas Thakur	Weightlifting	Men's 85Kg	8 February
Gold	Pradeep Singh	Weightlifting	Men's 94 Kg	8 February
Gold	Victor Abhilash Christopher	Weightlifting	Men's 105Kg	8 February
Gold	Shilpi Seron	Wrestling	Women's 63Kg Freestyle	8 February
Gold	Pradeep	Wrestling	Men's 74 Kg Freestyle	8 February
Gold	Rajani	Wrestling	Women's 69Kg Freestyle	8 February
Gold	Mausam Khatri	Wrestling	Men's 97Kg Freestyle	8 February
Gold	Nikki	Wrestling	Women's 75Kg Freestyle	8 February
Gold	M. Punshiva Meitei	Wushu	Taolu- Nanquan & Nangun	8 February
Gold	Purvasha Sudhir Shende, Jyothi Surekha Vennam, Lily Chanu Paonam	Archery	Compound Men's Team	8 February
Gold	Abhishek Verma, Rajat Chauhan, Manash Jyoti Changmai	Archery	Compound Men's Team	8 February
Gold	Abhishek Verma, Purvasha Sudhir Shende	Archery	Compound Mixed Team	8 February
Gold	Rajat Chauhan	Archery	Compound Men's Individual	8 February
Gold	Purvasha Sudhir Shende	Archery	Compound Women's Individual	8 February
Gold	Chirag Sharma	Wushu	Men;s Taolu- Daushu & Gunshu	9 February
Gold	Bidayuluxmi Tourangbam	Cycling	Women's 80Km Individual Road Race	9 February
Gold	Tarundeep Rai, Deepika Kumari	Archery	Recurve Mixed Team	9 February
Gold	Tarundeep Rai, Gurucharan Besra, Jayanta Talukdar	Archery	Recurve Men's Team	9 February
Gold	Deepika Kumari, Laishram Bombayla Devi, Laxmirani Majhi	Archery	Recurve Women's Team	9 February
Gold	Tarundeep Rai	Archery	Recurve Men's Individual	9 February
Gold	Deepika Kumari	Archery	Recurve Women's Individual	9 February
Gold	Saurabh Sangvekar	Swimming	Men's 400m Freestyle	9 February
Gold	V Malvika	Swimming	Women's 400m Freestyle	9 February
Gold	Sajan Prakash	Swimming	Men's 200m Butterfly	9 February
Gold	Damini Gowda	Swimming	Women's 200m Butterfly	9 February
Gold	P. S. Madhu	Swimming	Men's 50m Backstroke	9 February
Gold	Saurab Sangvekar, Raj Bhanwadia, Neil Contractor, Sajan Prakash	Swimming	Men's 4x200m Freestyle Relay	9 February
Gold	Shraddha Sudhir, V Malvika, Damini Gowda, Shivani Kataria	Swimming	Women's 4x200m Freestyle Relay	9 February
Gold	Women's Volleyball Team	Volleyball	Women's Team	9 February
Gold	Manpreet Kaur Sr	Athletics	Women's Shot put	9 February
Gold	Mayookha Johny	Athletics	Women's Long Jump	9 February
Gold	Neeraj Kumar	Athletics	Men's Hammer Throw	9 February
Gold	Man Singh	Athletics	Men's 5000m	9 February
Gold	Surya L	Athletics	Women's 5000m	9 February
Gold	Sushila Panwar	Weightlifting	Women's 75+ Kg	9 February
Gold	Men's Volleyball Team	Volleyball	Men's Team	9 February
Gold	Kho-Kho Men's Team	Kho Kho	Men's Team	9 February
Gold	Kho-Kho Women's Team	Kho Kho	Women's Team	9 February
Gold	Anthony Amalraj, Manika Batra	Table Tennis	Mixed Doubles	9 February
Gold	M Gyandash Singh	Wushu	Men's Taolu-Taijiquan & Taijijian	10 February
Gold	L Sanatombi Chanu	Wushu	Women's Taolu-Taijiquan & Taijijian	10 February
Gold	Ankita Raina	Tennis	Women's Singles	10 February
Gold	Omkar Singh, P.N. Prakash, Om Prakash	Shooting	Men's 50m Pistol Team	10 February
Gold	Ankita Raina, Divij Sharan	Tennis	Mixed Doubles	10 February
Gold	Saurav Ghoshal, Kush Kumar, Ravi Dixit, Harinder Pal Sandhu	Squash	Men's Team	10 February
Gold	Joshna Chinappa, Dipika Karthik, Sunayna Kuruvilla and Akanksha Salunkhe	Squash	Women's Team	10 February
Gold	Shraddha Sudhir	Swimming	Women's 200m Individual Medley	10 February
Gold	Virdhawal Khade	Swimming	Men's 50m Butterfly	10 February
Gold	Jyotsna Pansare	Swimming	Women's 50m Butterfly	10 February
Gold	P.S.Madhu, Sandeep Sejwal, Supriyo Mondal, Anshul Kothari	Swimming	Men's 4x100m Medley Relay	10 February
Gold	Maana Patel, Chahat Arora, Damini Gowda, Shivani Kataria	Swimming	Women's 4x100m Medley Relay	10 February
Gold	Anthony Amalraj	Table Tennis	Men's Singles	10 February
Gold	Sathiyan Gunasekaran, Devesh Karia	Table Tennis	Men's Doubles	10 February
Gold	Mouma Das	Table Tennis	Women's Singles	10 February
Gold	Manika Batra, Pooja Vijay Sahasrabudhe	Table Tennis	Women's Doubles	10 February
Gold	Gayathri Govindaraj	Athletics	Women's 110m Hurdles	10 February
Gold	Surendhar	Athletics	Men's 110m Hurdles	10 February
Gold	Akoria Rajiv	Athletics	Men's 400m	10 February
Gold	Neeraj Chopra	Athletics	Men's Javelin Throw	10 February
Gold	Ankit Sharma	Athletics	Men's Long Jump	10 February
Gold	Sahana Kumari	Athletics	Women's High Jump	10 February
Gold	Arjun	Athletics	Men's Discus Throw	10 February
Gold	Ramkumar Ramanathan / Prashanth Vijay Sunder	Tennis	Men's Doubles	10 February
Gold	Ruthvika Gadde	Badminton	Women's Singles	10 February
Gold	Srikanth Kidambi	Badminton	Men's Singles	10 February
Gold	Jwala Gutta, Ashwini Ponnappa	Badminton	Women's Doubles	10 February
Gold	Manu Attri, B. Sumeeth Reddy	Badminton	Men's Doubles	10 February
Gold	Pranav Chopra, N. Sikki Reddy	Badminton	Mixed Doubles	10 February
Gold	Mayookha Johny	Athletics	Women's Triple Jump	10 February
Gold	M. R. Poovamma	Athletics	Women's 400m	10 February
Gold	Surender	Athletics	Men's 10000m	10 February
Gold	Apurvi Chandela, Pooja Ghatkar Koshy Elizabeth Susan	Shooting	10m Air Rifle Women Team	10 February
Gold	Apurvi Chandela	Shooting	10m Air Rifle Women	10 February
Gold	Uchit Sharma	Wushu	Men's Sanshou 52 Kg	10 February
Gold	Ravi panchal	Wushu	Men's Sanshou 56 Kg	10 February
Gold	Surya Bhanu Pratap Singh	Wushu	Men's Sanshou 60 Kg	10 February
Gold	Y. Sanathoi Devi	Wushu	Women's Sanshou 52 Kg	10 February
Gold	Anupama Devi	Wushu	Women's Sanshou 60 Kg	10 February
Gold	Puja Kadian	Wushu	Women's Sanshou 70 Kg	10 February
Gold	Prarthana Thombare, Sarmada Balu	Tennis	Women's Doubles	11 February
Gold	Ramkumar Ramanathan	Tennis	Men's Singles	11 February
Gold	Dharun A	Athletics	Men's 400m Hurdles	11 February
Gold	Joana Murmu	Athletics	Women's 400m Hurdles	11 February
Gold	Gagan Narang, Chain Singh, Rathod Surendra Singh	Shooting	Men's 50m Rifle Prone Team	11 February
Gold	Gagan Narang	Shooting	Men's 50m Rifle Prone	11 February
Gold	Samaresh Jung, Vijay Kumar, Pemba Tamang	Shooting	25 M Center Fire Pistol Men Team	11 February
Gold	Samaresh Jung	Shooting	Men's 25m Center Fire Pistol Men	11 February
Gold	Kuheli Gangulee, Lajja Gauswami, Anuja Jung	Shooting	Women's 50m Rifle Prone Team	11 February
Gold	Kuheli Gangulee	Shooting	Women's 50m Rifle Prone	11 February
Gold	Om Prakash Singh Karhana	Athletics	Men's Shot put	11 February
Gold	Suman Devi	Athletics	Women's Javeline Throw	11 February
Gold	Renjith Maheswary	Athletics	Men's Triple Jump	11 February
Gold	PU Chitra	Athletics	Women's 1500m	11 February
Gold	Ajay Kumar saroj	Athletics	Men's 1500m	11 February
Gold	Surya L	Athletics	Women's 10000m	11 February
Gold	Kunhu Mohamed, Mohamed Anaz, Chandan Bauri, Sumith kumar, A.Dharun	Athletics	Men's 4x400m Relay	11 February
Gold	M. R. Poovamma, Priyanka Panwar, Sini Jose, Debashree Maajumdar, Anju Thomas	Athletics	Women's 4x400m Relay	11 February
Gold	Srabani Nanda	Athletics	Women's 200m	11 February
Gold	Women's Hockey Team	Field Hockey	Women's Team	11 February
Gold	Nitender Singh Rawat	Athletics	Men's Marathon	12 February
Gold	Kavita Raut	Athletics	Women's Marathon	12 February
Gold	Kumar Neeraj	Shooting	25 M Standard Pistol Men	12 February
Gold	Kumar Neeraj, Gurpreet Singh, Mahender Singh	Shooting	25 M Standard Pistol Men Team	12 February
Gold	Chain Singh	Shooting	10 M Air Rifle Men	12 February
Gold	Chain Singh, Gagan Narang, Khan Imran Hasan	Shooting	10 M Air Rifle Men Team	12 February
Gold	Anjum Modgil, Koshy Elizabeth Susan, Lajja Gauswami	Shooting	50 M Rifle 3 Position Women Team	13 February
Gold	Anjum Modglil	Shooting	50 M Rifle 3 Position Women	13 February
Gold	Omkar Singh, Gurpreet Singh, Jitendra Vibhute	Shooting	10 M Air Pistol Team	13 February
Gold	Omkar Singh	Shooting	10 M Air Pistol	13 February
Gold	Rahi Sarnobat, Anisa Sayyed, Annu Raj Singh	Shooting	25 M Pistol Women Team	13 February
Gold	Rahi Sarnobal	Shooting	25 M Pistol Women	13 February
Gold	Dilip Kumar	Triathlon	Men's Individual	13 February
Gold	Pallavi Retiwala	Triathlon	Women's Individual	13 February
Gold	P. Anand	Taekwondo	Men's 80–87 Kg	13 February
Gold	Pallawi Retiwala, Dilip Kumar Sorohni DeviI Thoudam, Dhiraj Sawant	Triathlon	Mixed Relay	14 February
Gold	Chain Singh, Gagan Narang, Surendra Singh Rathore	Shooting	50 M Rifle 3 Position Team	14 February
Gold	Chain Singh	Shooting	Men's 50 M Rifle 3 Position	14 February
Gold	Purva Dixit	Taekwondo	Women's 46–49 Kg	14 February
Gold	Navjeet Maan	Taekwondo	Men's 74–80 Kg	15 February
Gold	Margerita Regi	Taekwondo	Women's 57–62 Kg	15 February
Gold	Latika Bhandari	Taekwondo	Women's 49–53 Kg	15 February
Gold	L. Devendro Singh	Boxing	Men's 49 Kg	15 February
Gold	Madan Lal	Boxing	Men's 52 Kg	15 February
Gold	Shiva Thapa	Boxing	Men's 56 Kg	15 February
Gold	Dheeraj Rangi	Boxing	Men's 60 Kg	15 February
Gold	Manoj Kumar	Boxing	Men's 64 Kg	15 February
Gold	Women's Football Team	Football	Women's Football Team	15 February
Gold	L. Shushila Devi	Judo	Women's -48 Kg	15 February
Gold	T, Kalpana Devi	Judo	Women's -52 Kg	15 February
Gold	Women's Kabaddi Team	Kabaddi	Women's Kabaddi Team	15 February
Gold	Heena Sidhu, Yashashwini Singh Deswal, Shweta Singh	Shooting	Women's 10 M Air Pistol Team	15 February
Gold	Shweta Singh	Shooting	Women's 10 M Air Pistol	15 February
Gold	Vijay Kumar, Gurpreet Singh, Akshay Suhas Ashaputre	Shooting	Men's 25 M Rapid Fire Pistol Team	15 February
Gold	Gurpreet Singh	Shooting	Men's 25 M Rapid Fire Pistol	15 February
Gold	Vikas Krishnan	Boxing	Men's 75 Kg	15 February
Gold	Men's Kabaddi Team	Kabaddi	Men's Kabaddi Team	15 February
Gold	Angom Anita Chanu	Judo	Women's -57 Kg	15 February
Gold	Bupinder Singh	Judo	Men's -60 Kg	15 February
Gold	Jasleen Singh Saini	Judo	Men's -66 Kg	15 February
Gold	Manjeet Nandal	Judo	Men's -73 Kg	15 February
Gold	Karanjit Singh Maan	Judo	Men's -81 Kg	15 February
Gold	Women's Handball Team	Handball	Women's Team	15 February
Gold	Men's Handball Team	Handball	Men's Team	15 February
Gold	Avtar Singh	Judo	Men's -90 Kg	16 February
Gold	Pooja	Judo	Women's -70 Kg	16 February
Gold	M. C. Marykom	Boxing	Women's 51 Kg	16 February
Gold	L. Sarita Devi	Boxing	Women's 60 Kg	16 February
Gold	Pooja Rani Bohra	Boxing	Women's 75 Kg	16 February
Silver	Chaoba Devi Eangbam	Cycling	Women's 30km Individual Time Trial	6 February
Silver	Manjeet Singh	Cycling	Men's 40km Individual Time Trial	6 February
Silver	Saurabh Sangvekar	Swimming	Men's 200m Freestyle	6 February
Silver	Supriyo Mondal	Swimming	Men's 100m Butterfly	6 February
Silver	Neil Contractor, S P Nair Sharma, Sahil Chopra, Anshul Kothari	Swimming	Men's 4x100m Freestyle Relay	6 February
Silver	Manorama Devi Tongbram	Cycling	Women's 40 Km Criterium	7 February
Silver	Saurabh Sangvekar	Swimming	Men's 1500m Freestyle	7 February
Silver	Shradha Sudhir	Swimming	Women's 400m Individual Medley	7 February
Silver	Punit Rana	Swimming	Men's 100 Breaststroke	7 February
Silver	Gopal Yadav	Wrestling	Men's 86Kg Freestyle	7 February
Silver	Virdhawal Khade	Swimming	Men's 50m Freestyle	7 February
Silver	Maana Patel	Swimming	Women's 200m Backstroke	7 February
Silver	Sanu Debnath	Swimming	Men's 400m Individual Medley	8 February
Silver	Sethu Manickavel	Swimming	Men's 100m Backstroke	8 February
Silver	Maana Patel	Swimming	Women's 100m Backstroke	8 February
Silver	Punit Rana	Swimming	Men's 50 Breaststroke	8 February
Silver	Mandeep	Wrestling	Men's 125Kg Freestyle	8 February
Silver	Swechcha Jatav	Wushu	Taolu- Nanquan & Nando	8 February
(silver) Silver	Saurav Ghoshal	Squash	Men's Singles	8 February
(silver) Silver	Harinder Pal Singh	Squash	Men's Singles	8 February
Silver	Abhishek Verma	Archery	Compound Men's Individual	8 February
Silver	Jyothi Surekha Vennam	Archery	Compound Women's Individual	8 February
Silver	Gurdeep Singh	Weightlifting	Men's 105+ Kg	9 February
Silver	Lidiyamol Sunny Menamparambil	Cycling	Women's 80Km Individual Road Race	9 February
Silver	Pankaj Kumar	Cycling	Men's 100Km Individual Road Race	9 February
Silver	Gurucharan Besra	Archery	Recurve Men's Individual	9 February
Silver	Laishram Bombayla Devi	Archery	Recurve Women's Individual	9 February
Silver	Sajan Prakash	Swimming	Men's 400m Freestyle	9 February
Silver	Shivani Kataria	Swimming	Women's 400m Freestyle	9 February
Silver	M Arvind	Swimming	Men's 50m Backstroke	9 February
Silver	Maana Patel	Swimming	Women's 5m Backstroke	9 February
Silver	Manpreet Kaur Jr	Athletics	Women's Shot put	9 February
Silver	Shrada Gule Bhaskar	Athletics	Women's Long Jump	9 February
Silver	Suresh Kumar Patil	Athletics	Men's 5000m	9 February
Silver	Swathy Gadhave	Athletics	Women's 5000m	9 February
Silver	Thejeswar Sankar	Athletics	Men's High Jump	9 February
Silver	Srabani Nanda	Athletics	Women's 100m	9 February
Silver	Sathiyan Gunasekaran, Mouma Das	Table Tennis	Mixed Doubles	9 February
Silver	Prerna Bhambri	Tennis	Women's Singles	10 February
Silver	Prarthana Thombare, Sanam Singh	Tennis	Mixed Doubles	10 February
Silver	Sanu Debnath	Swimming	Men's 200m Individual Medley	10 February
Silver	Anshul Kothari	Swimming	Men's 50m Butterfly	10 February
Silver	Avantika Chavan	Swimming	Women's 50m Butterfly	10 February
Silver	Sathiyan Gunasekaran	Table Tennis	Men's Singles	10 February
Silver	Anthony Amalraj, Sanil Sankar Shetty	Table Tennis	Men's Doubles	10 February
Silver	Manika Batra	Table Tennis	Women's Singles	10 February
Silver	Mouma Das, Shamini Kumaresan	Table Tennis	Women's Doubles	10 February
Silver	Sajitha KV	Athletics	Women's 110m Hurdles	10 February
Silver	Prem Kumar	Athletics	Men's 110m Hurdles	10 February
Silver	Kuhu Muhammad	Athletics	Men's 400m	10 February
Silver	Prem Kumar Kumaravel	Athletics	Men's Long Jump	10 February
Silver	Swapna Burman	Athletics	Women's High Jump	10 February
Silver	Sonu Saini	Athletics	Women's Paul Vault	10 February
Silver	Kripal Singh	Athletics	Men's Discus Throw	10 February
Silver	Divij Sharan, Sanam Singh	Tennis	Men's Doubles	10 February
Silver	P. V. Sindhu	Badminton	Women's Singles	10 February
Silver	Prannoy H. S.	Badminton	Men's Singles	10 February
Silver	K. Maneesha, N. Sikki Reddy	Badminton	Women's Doubles	10 February
Silver	Akshay Dewalkar, Pranav Chopra	Badminton	Men's Doubles	10 February
Silver	Manu Attri, Ashwini Ponnappa	Badminton	Mixed Doubles	10 February
Silver	Dutee Chand, Srabani Nanda, Neethu Mathew, Hemashree Roy, Situi Singh, Sinin s	Athletics	Women's 4x100 m Relay	10 February
Silver	Gopi T	Athletics	Men's 10000m	10 February
Silver	Om Prakash	Shooting	Men's 50m Pistol Team	10 February
Silver	Koshy Elizabeth Susan	Shooting	10m Air Rifle Women	10 February
Silver	Mukesh Choudhary	Wushu	Men's Sanshou 70Kg	10 February
Silver	Rishika Sunkura, Natasha Palha	Tennis	Women's Doubles	11 February
Silver	Saketh Myneni	Tennis	Men's Singles	11 February
Silver	Jithin Paul	Athletics	Men's 400m Hurdles	11 February
Silver	Ashwini Akkunji	Athletics	Women's 400m Hurdles	11 February
Silver	Chain Singh	Shooting	Men's 50m Rifle Prone	11 February
Silver	Pemba Tamang	Shooting	Men's 25m Center Fire Pistol Men	11 February
Silver	Lajja Gauswami	Shooting	Women's 50m Rifle Prone	11 February
Silver	Annu Rani	Athletics	Women's Javeline Throw	11 February
Silver	Surendher J	Athletics	Men's Triple Jump	11 February
Silver	Swathy Gadhave	Athletics	Women's 10000m	11 February
Silver	Dutee Chand	Athletics	Women's 200m	11 February
Silver	Jasdeep Singh	Athletics	Men's Shot put	11 February
Silver	Gurpreet Singh	Shooting	25 M Standard Pistol Men	12 February
Silver	Men's Field Hockey Team	Field Hockey	Men's Team	12 February
Silver	Koshy Elizabeth Susan	Shooting	50 M Rifle 3 Position Women	13 February
Silver	Annu Raj Singh	Shooting	25 M Pistol Women	13 February
Silver	Guru Datt	Triathlon	Men's Individual	13 February
Silver	Pooja Chaurushi	Triathlon	Women's Individual	13 February
Silver	Abrar Khan	Taekwondo	Men's -54Kg	13 February
Silver	Gagan Narang	Shooting	Men's 50 M Rifle 3 Position	14 February
Silver	Gajendra Parihar	Taekwondo	Men's 54-58Kg	14 February
Silver	Manu George	Taekwondo	Men's 68-74Kg	14 February
Silver	Heena Sidhu	Shooting	Women's 10 M Air Pistol	15 February
Silver	Huidrom Sunibala Devi	Judo	Women's -63 Kg	15 February
Silver	Men's Football Team	Football	Men's Team	15 February
Silver	Shubham Kumar	Judo	Men's -100 Kg	16 February
Silver	Aruna	Judo	Women's −78 Kg	16 February
Bronze	Pankaj Kumar	Cycling	Men's 60Km Criterium	7 February
Bronze	Chaht Arora	Swimming	Women's 100m Backstroke	7 February
Bronze	Anjul Namdeo	Wushu	Taolu-Changquan	7 February
Bronze	Maana Patel	Swimming	Women's 50m Freestyle	8 February
Bronze	Geethu Raj N	Cycling	Women's 80Km Individual Road Race	9 February
Bronze	Gomathi M	Athletics	Women's 800m	9 February
Bronze	Ajay Kumar	Athletics	Men's High Jump	9 February
Bronze	Dutee Chand	Athletics	Women's 100m	9 February
Bronze	Maana Patel	Swimming	Women's 100m Freestyle	10 February
Bronze	Ajay kumar saroj	Athletics	Men's 800m	10 February
Bronze	Gaurav kumar, Akshy khot, Adhitya Vardan, Rahul Kumar, Sujith Kuttan, Vidya Sagar	Athletics	Men's 4x100m Relay	10 February
Bronze	M. A. Prajusha	Athletics	Women's Triple Jump	10 February
Bronze	Pooja Ghatkar	Shooting	10m Air Rifle Women	10 February
Bronze	Arun Nagar	Wushu	Men's Sanshou 65Kg	10 February
Bronze	Pradeep Kumar	Wushu	Men's Sanshou 75Kg	10 February
Bronze	Vijay Kumar	Shooting	Men's 25m Center Fire Pistol Men	11 February
Bronze	Anuja Jung	Shooting	Women's 50m Rifle Prone	11 February
Bronze	Rahul	Athletics	Men's 1500m	11 February
Bronze	Khetha Ram	Athletics	Men's marathon	12 February
Bronze	Mahender Singh	Shooting	25 M Standard Pistol Men	12 February
Bronze	Gagan Narang	Shooting	10 M Air Rifle Men	12 February
Bronze	Lajja Gauswami	Shooting	50 M Rifle 3 Position Women	13 February
Bronze	Jitendra Vibhute	Shooting	10 M Air Pistol	13 February
Bronze	Anisa Sayyed	Shooting	25 M Pistol Women	13 February
Bronze	Naveen	Taekwondo	Men's 63–68 Kg	13 February
Bronze	S Ramchiary	Taekwondo	Women's 53-57Kg	14 February
Bronze	Yashaswini Singh Deswal	Shooting	Women's 10 M Air Pistol	15 February
Bronze	Vijay Kumar	Shooting	Men's 25 M Rapid Fire Pistol	15 February

== Archery ==
=== Men ===
==== Recurve ====
Athlete	Event	Ranking Round		Round of 16	Quarterfinals	Semifinals	Finals / BM					
Athlete	Event	Score	Seed	Opposition Score	Opposition Score	Opposition Score	Opposition Score	Rank				
Tarundeep Rai	Individual	676	1st	—N/a	(Bhutan) Kinly Tshering; W 6-5	(Nepal) Prem Prasad Pun; W 6-0	(India) Gurucharan Besra; W 6-2	1st place, gold medalist(s)				
Gurucharan Besra	Individual	666	2nd	—N/a	(Bhutan) Jigme Norbu; W 7-1	(Sri Lanka) Nipuna Senevirathne; W 7-3	(India) Tarundeep Rai; L 2-6	2nd place, silver medalist(s)				
Jayanta Talukdar	Individual	665	3rd	Did Not Advance								
Binod Swansi	Individual	653	5th	Did Not Advance								
Tarundeep Rai Gurucharan Besra Jayanta Talukdar	Team	2007	1st	NIL	NIL	Bye		Bhutan (BHU)	5–1 W	Bangladesh (BAN)	5–1 W	1st place, gold medalist(s)

==== Compound ====
Athlete	Event	Ranking Round		1/16 Elimination		Quarterfinals		Semifinals		Finals / Bronze medal playoffs		Rank
Athlete	Event	Score	Seed	Opposition	Score	Opposition	Score	Opposition	Score	Opposition	Score	
Abhishek Verma	Individual	704	1st	Bye		Kishore Kumar Gurung; Nepal (NEP)	144–138; W	Tshewang Dorji; Bhutan (BHU)	148–135; W	Rajat Chauhan; India (IND)	142–144 L	2nd place, silver medalist(s)
Rajat Chauhan	Individual	693	2nd	Bye		Udaya Indrajith; Sri Lanka (SRI)	146–134; W	Tashi Deljor; Bhutan (BHU)	145–142; W	Abhishek Verma; India (IND)	144–142 W	1st place, gold medalist(s)
Manash Jyoti Changmai	Individual	692	3rd	Did Not Advance								
Chinna Raju Srithar	Individual	689	4th	Did Not Advance								
Abhishek Verma Rajat Chauhan Manash Jyoti Changmai	Team	2089	1st	NIL	NIL	Bye		Nepal (NEP)	233–215 W	Bhutan (BHU)	230–219 W	1st place, gold medalist(s)

=== Women ===
==== Recurve ====
Athlete	Event	Ranking Round		1/16 Elimination		Quarterfinals		Semifinals		Finals / Bronze medal playoffs		Rank
Athlete	Event	Score	Seed	Opposition	Score	Opposition	Score	Opposition	Score	Opposition	Score	
Deepika Kumari	Individual	668	1st	Bye		Sonam Deki; Bhutan (BHU)	6–2; W	Beauty Ray; Bangladesh (BAN)	6–0; W	Laishram Bombayla Devi; India (IND)	6–4; W	1st place, gold medalist(s)
Laishram Bombayla Devi	Individual	646	2nd	Bye		Anuradha Karunaratne; Sri Lanka (SRI)	6–5; W	Karma; Bhutan (BHU)	6–2; W	Deepika Kumari; India (IND)	4–6; L	2nd place, silver medalist(s)
Laxmirani Majhi	Individual	632	3rd	Did Not Advance								
Madhu Vedwan	Individual	614	6th	Did Not Advance								
Deepika Kumari Laishram Bombayla Devi Laxmirani Majhi	Team	1946	1st	NIL	NIL	Bye		Bhutan (BHU)	6–0 W	Sri Lanka (SRI)	6–0 W	1st place, gold medalist(s)

==== Compound ====
Athlete	Event	Ranking Round		Quarterfinals		Semifinals		Finals / Bronze medal playoffs		Rank
Athlete	Event	Score	Seed	Opposition	Score	Opposition	Score	Opposition	Score	Rank
Purvasha Sudhir Shende	Individual	686	1st	BYE		Tamanna Parvin; Bangladesh (BAN)	139–139; W	Jyothi Surekha Vennam; India (IND)	138–133 W	1st place, gold medalist(s)
Jyothi Surekha Vennam	Individual	684	2nd	BYE		Sushmita Banik; Bangladesh (BAN)	145–134; W	Purvasha Sudhir Shende; India (IND)	133–138 L	2nd place, silver medalist(s)
Lily Chanu Paonam	Individual	678	4th	Did Not Advance						
Swati Dudhwal	Individual	677	5th	Did Not Advance						
Purvasha Sudhir Shende Jyothi Surekha Vennam Lily Chanu Paonam	Team	2048	1st	NIL	NIL	Bye		Bangladesh (BAN)	228–217 W	1st place, gold medalist(s)

=== Mixed ===
Recurve

Athletes	Qualifications		Quarterfinals		Semifinals		Finals		Rank
Athletes	Score	Seed	Opposition	Score	Opposition	Score	Opposition	Score	Rank
Tarundeep Rai / Deepika Kumari	1344	1st	Bye		Nipuna Senevirathne / Dilhara Salgado; Sri Lanka (SRI)	5–4 W	Sojeb Sheik / Beauty Ray; Bangladesh (BAN)	6–0 W	1st place, gold medalist(s)

Compound

Athletes	Qualification		Semifinals		Finals		Rank
Athletes	Score	Seed	Opposition	Score	Opposition	Score	Rank
Abhishek Verma / Purvasha Sudhir Shende	1390	1st	Bye		Md. Anowerul Kadar / Sushmita Banik; Bangladesh (BAN)	156–138 W	1st place, gold medalist(s)

== Athletics ==
Key

- Q = Qualified for the next round
- q = Qualified for the next round as a fastest loser or, in field events, by position without achieving the qualifying target
- NR = National record
- N/A = Round not applicable for the event

=== Men ===
Track & road events

Athlete	Event	Heat		Final	
Athlete	Event	Result	Rank	Result	Rank
Gaurav kumar	100 m	10.95	4th Q	10.96	7th
Akshy khot	100 m	11:12	5th	Did Not Advance	
Adhitya Vardan	200 m	22.26 q	5th	22.43	8th
Vidaya Sagar	200 m	21.70 Q	2nd	21.61	5th
Arokia Rajiv	400 m	47.87	1st Q	46.23	1st place, gold medalist(s)
Kunhu mohamed	400 m	47.42	1st Q	46.73	2nd place, silver medalist(s)
Ajay Kumar Saroj	800 m	—N/a		1:52:4	3rd place, bronze medalist(s)
Rahul	800 m	—N/a		1:53:87	5th
Ajay Kumar Saroj	1500 m	—N/a		3:53:46	1st place, gold medalist(s)
Rahul	1500 m	—N/a		3:55:07	3rd place, bronze medalist(s)
Suresh Kumar Patil	5000 m	—N/a		14:02:70	2nd place, silver medalist(s)
Man Singh	5000 m	—N/a		14:02:04 GR	1st place, gold medalist(s)
Suresh Kumar	10000 m	—N/a		29:10:53 GR	1st place, gold medalist(s)
Thonakal Gopi	10000 m	—N/a		29:20:49	2nd place, silver medalist(s)
Surendhar	110 m hurdle			14.13	1st place, gold medalist(s)
Prem Kumar K	110 m hurdle			14.18	2nd place, silver medalist(s)
Jitin Paul	400 m hurdle	—N/a		50.57	2nd place, silver medalist(s)
Ayyasamy Dharun	400 m hurdle	—N/a		50.54	1st place, gold medalist(s)
Nitendra Singh Rawat	marathon	—N/a		2:15:18.00	1st place, gold medalist(s)
Kheta Ram	marathon	—N/a		2:21:14.00	3rd place, bronze medalist(s)
Gaurav kumar	4×100 m relay	—N/a		41.9	3rd place, bronze medalist(s)
Akshy Khot	4×100 m relay	—N/a		41.9	3rd place, bronze medalist(s)
Adhitya Vardan	4×100 m relay	—N/a		41.9	3rd place, bronze medalist(s)
Rahul Kumar	4×100 m relay	—N/a		41.9	3rd place, bronze medalist(s)
Sujith Kuttan	4×100 m relay	—N/a		41.9	3rd place, bronze medalist(s)
Vidya Sagar	4×100 m relay	—N/a		41.9	3rd place, bronze medalist(s)
Arokia Rajiv	4×400 m relay	—N/a		3:06:74	1st place, gold medalist(s)
Kunhu Muhammed	4×400 m relay	—N/a		3:06:74	1st place, gold medalist(s)
Mohammad Anas	4×400 m relay	—N/a		3:06:74	1st place, gold medalist(s)
Chandan Bauri	4×400 m relay	—N/a		3:06:74	1st place, gold medalist(s)
Sumith kumar	4×400 m relay	—N/a		3:06:74	1st place, gold medalist(s)
Ayyasamy Dharun	4×400 m relay	—N/a		3:06:74	1st place, gold medalist(s)

Field events

Athlete	Event	Final	
Athlete	Event	Distance	Position
Ankit Sharma	Long jump	7.89 GR	1st place, gold medalist(s)
Prem Kumar Kumaravel	Long jump	7.62	2nd place, silver medalist(s)
Renjith Maheswary	Triple jump	16.45 GR	1st place, gold medalist(s)
Surendhar T	Triple jump	15.89	2nd place, silver medalist(s)
Tejaswin Shankar	High jump	2.17	2nd place, silver medalist(s)
Ajay Kumar	High jump	2.08	3rd place, bronze medalist(s)
Anuj	Pole vault	NM	NM
Sonu Saini	Pole vault	4.80	2nd place, silver medalist(s)
Jasdeep Singh	Shot put	17.56	2nd place, silver medalist(s)
Om Prakash Singh Karhana	Shot put	18.45	1st place, gold medalist(s)
Kripal Singh	Discus throw	56.59	2nd place, silver medalist(s)
Arjun	Discus throw	57.21	1st place, gold medalist(s)
Neeraj Kumar	Hammer throw	66.14	1st place, gold medalist(s)
Pragat Singh	Hammer throw	NA	NA
Neeraj Chopra	Javelin throw	86.46	1st place, gold medalist(s)
Akshay Chaudhary	Javelin throw	85.46	2nd place, silver medalist(s)

=== Women ===
Track & road events

Athlete	Event	Heat		Final	
Athlete	Event	Result	Rank	Result	Rank
Dutee Chand	100 m	11.88	1st Q	11.75	3rd place, bronze medalist(s)
Srabani Nanda	100 m	11.71	2nd Q	11.72	2nd place, silver medalist(s)
Dutee Chand	200 m	24.60	1st Q	24.14	2nd place, silver medalist(s)
Srabani Nanda	200 m	24.29	1st Q	23.91	1st place, gold medalist(s)
M. R. Poovamma	400 m			54.1	1st place, gold medalist(s)
Priyanka Panwar	400 m			56.5	4th
Gomathi M	800 m	—N/a		2:10:99	3rd place, bronze medalist(s)
Sipra Sarkar	800 m	—N/a		2:11:13	4th
Sugandha Kumari	1500 m	—N/a		4:27:39	4th
PU Chitra	1500 m	—N/a		4:25:59	1st place, gold medalist(s)
Surya L	5000 m	—N/a		15:45:75 GR	1st place, gold medalist(s)
Swathy Gadhave	5000 m	—N/a		16:14:57	2nd place, silver medalist(s)
Surya L	10000 m	—N/a		32:39:86 GR	1st place, gold medalist(s)
Swathy Gadhave	10000 m	—N/a		33:57:09	2nd place, silver medalist(s)
Gayathri Govindaraj	110 m hurdle			13.83	1st place, gold medalist(s)
Sajitha KV	110 m hurdle			14.26	2nd place, silver medalist(s)
Joana Murmu	400 m hurdle	—N/a		57.69	1st place, gold medalist(s)
Ashwini Akkunji	400 m hurdle	—N/a		58.92	2nd place, silver medalist(s)
Kavitha Raut	marathon	—N/a		2:38:38.00	1st place, gold medalist(s)
Jyothi Gawate	marathon	—N/a		2:54:33.00	4th
Dutee Chand	4×100 m relay	—N/a		45.79	2nd place, silver medalist(s)
Srabani Nanda	4×100 m relay	—N/a		45.79	2nd place, silver medalist(s)
Neethu Mathew	4×100 m relay	—N/a		45.79	2nd place, silver medalist(s)
Hemashree Roy	4×100 m relay	—N/a		45.79	2nd place, silver medalist(s)
Situi Singh	4×100 m relay	—N/a		45.79	2nd place, silver medalist(s)
Sinin s	4×100 m relay	—N/a		45.79	2nd place, silver medalist(s)
M. R. Poovamma	4×400 m relay	—N/a		3:35:44	1st place, gold medalist(s)
Priyanka Panwar	4×400 m relay	—N/a		3:35:44	1st place, gold medalist(s)
Sini Jose	4×400 m relay	—N/a		3:35:44	1st place, gold medalist(s)
Debashree Maajumdar	4×400 m relay	—N/a		3:35:44	1st place, gold medalist(s)
Anju Thomas	4×400 m relay	—N/a		3:35:44	1st place, gold medalist(s)

Field events

Athlete	Event	Final	
Athlete	Event	Distance	Position
Mayookha Johny	Long jump	6.43 GR	1st place, gold medalist(s)
Shrada Gule Bhaskar	Long jump	6.19	2nd place, silver medalist(s)
Mayookha Johny	Triple jump	13.85 GR	1st place, gold medalist(s)
M. A. Prajusha	Triple jump	12.95	3rd place, bronze medalist(s)
Sahana Kumari	High jump	1.78	1st place, gold medalist(s)
Swapna Burman	High jump	1.75	2nd place, silver medalist(s)
Manpreeth Kaur Sr	Shot put	17.94 GR	1st place, gold medalist(s)
Manpreeth Kaur Jr	Shot put	15.94	2nd place, silver medalist(s)
Annu Rani	Javelin throw	57.13	2nd place, silver medalist(s)
Suman Devi	Javelin throw	59.45 GR	1st place, gold medalist(s)

== Badminton ==
=== Men ===
1. Srikanth Kidambi,
2. Ajay Jayaram,
3. Prannoy H. S.,
4. B. Sai Praneeth,
5. Manu Attri,
6. B. Sumeeth Reddy,
7. Akshay Dewalkar,
8. Pranav Chopra

Team:

Date	Opponent	Result	Singles-1	Singles-2	Doubles-1	Singles-3	Doubles-2
6 February	Maldives (MDV); Group-A	3–0; W	Srikanth Kidambi vs Mohamad Ajfan Rasheed; 21–17 21–12 W	Ajay Jayaram vs Hussain Zayan Shaheed Zaki; 21–8 21–5 W	Manu Attri / B. Sumeeth Reddy vs Mohamad Ajfan Rasheed / Hussain Zayan Shaheed Zaki; 21–8 21–10 W		
6 February	Bangladesh (BAN); Group-A	3–0; W	Prannoy H. S. vs Ayman Jaman; 21–14 21–13 W	B. Sai Praneeth vs Rais Uddin; 21–17 21–18 W	Manu Attri / B. Sumeeth Reddy vs Ayman Jaman / Rais Uddin; 21–8 21–9 W		
7 February	Afghanistan (AFG) Group-A	3–0 W	Ajay Jayaram vs Sayid Mohd Kabir Mirzad 21–4 21–4 W	Prannoy H. S. vs Ahmed Fahim Yari 21–8 21–11 W	Akshay Dewalkar / Pranav Chopra vs Syind Imran Miri / Ahmed Fahim Yari 21–9 21–9 W		
8 February	Pakistan (PAK) Semifinal	3–0 W	Srikanth Kidambi vs Md Irfan 21–19 21–15 W	Ajay Jayaram vs Murad Aliq 21–11 21–16 W	Manu Attri / B. Sumeeth Reddy vs Kashif Sulhari / Rizwan Azam 21–9 21–18 W		
8 February	Sri Lanka (SRI) Final	3–0 W	Srikanth Kidambi vs Buwaneka Goonethilleka 21–14 21–14 W	Prannoy H. S. vs Sachin Dias 21–13 21–16 W	Manu Attri / B. Sumeeth Reddy vs Buwaneka Goonethilleka / Sachin Dias 21–12 21–11 W		

Singles:

Athlete	R16	Quarterfinal	Semifinal	Final	Rank
Srikanth Kidambi	Bikash Shrestha Nepal (NEP) 21–14 21–10 W	Ahmed Thoif Mohamed Maldives (MDV); 21–11 21–7 W	Muhammad Irfan Saeed Bhatti Pakistan (PAK) W	Prannoy H. S. India (IND) 11–21 21–14 21–6 W	1st place, gold medalist(s)
Prannoy H. S.	Karma Chendru Bhutan (BHU) 21–13 21–7 W	Munad Ali Pakistan (PAK) 21–11 21–15 W	Sachin Dias Sri Lanka (SRI) 14–21 21–13 21–16 W	Srikanth Kidambi India (IND) 21–11 14–21 6–21 L	2nd place, silver medalist(s)

Doubles:

Athlete	R16	Quarterfinal	Semifinal	Final	Rank
Manu Attri / B. Sumeeth Reddy	Bye	Azeem Sarwar / Muhammad Irfan Saeed Bhatti Pakistan (PAK) 21–14 21–17 W		Akshay Dewalkar / Pranav Chopra India (IND) 21–18 21–17 W	1st place, gold medalist(s)
Akshay Dewalkar / Pranav Chopra	Bye	Enam Enamul Haq / Parash Ahsun Habib Bangladesh (BAN) 21–10 21–11 W		Manu Attri / B. Sumeeth Reddy India (IND) 18–21 17–21 L	2nd place, silver medalist(s)

=== Women ===
1. P. V. Sindhu
2. P. C. Thulasi
3. Ruthvika Gadde
4. Jwala Gutta
5. Ashwini Ponnappa
6. K. Maneesha
7. N. Sikki Reddy

Team:

Date	Opponent	Result	Singles-1	Singles-2	Doubles-1	Singles-3	Doubles-2
7 February	Nepal (NEP); Group-A	3–0 W	P. V. Sindhu vs Sara Devi Tamang 21–2 21–8 W	Ruthvika Gadde vs Nangsal Tamang 21–6 21–2 W	Ashwini Ponnappa / P. V. Sindhu vs Sara Devi Tamang / Nangsal Tamang 21–10 21–8 W		
7 February	Bangladesh (BAN) Semifinal	3–0 W	P. V. Sindhu vs Alina 21–7 21–5 W	Ruthvika Gadde vs Dulaly 21–5 21–6 W	Ashwini Ponnappa / P. V. Sindhu vs Brishty / Dulaly 21–11 21–12 W		
8 February	Sri Lanka (SRI) Final	3–0 W	P. V. Sindhu vs Kavidi Sirimannage 21–7 21–5 W	Ruthvika Gadde vs Thilini Hendahewa 23–21 21–13 W	Ashwini Ponnappa / P. V. Sindhu vs Achini Ratnasiri / Upuli Weerasinghe 21–13 21–13 W		

Singles:

Athlete	R16	Quarterfinal	Semifinal	Final	Rank
P. V. Sindhu	Bye	Aishath Afnaan Rasheed Maldives (MDV); 21–7 21–7 W		Ruthvika Gadde India (IND) 11–21 20–22 L	2nd place, silver medalist(s)
Ruthvika Gadde	Thilini Hendahewa Sri Lanka (SRI) 21–9 21–8 W	Khijana Pakistan (PAK) 21–6 21–7 W		P. V. Sindhu India (IND) 21–11 22–20 W	1st place, gold medalist(s)

Doubles:

Athlete	R16	Quarterfinal	Semifinal	Final	Rank
Jwala Gutta / Ashwini Ponnappa	Bye	Chandrika de Silva / Nadeesha Gayanthi Sri Lanka (SRI) 21–11 21–12 W	/ Pakistan (PAK) 21–9 21–3 W	K. Maneesha/ N. Sikki Reddy India (IND) 21–9 21–17 W	1st place, gold medalist(s)
K. Maneesha/ N. Sikki Reddy	Bye	Saima Wagas / Sara Pakistan (PAK) 21–9 21–9 W		Jwala Gutta / Ashwini Ponnappa India (IND) 9–21 17–21 L	2nd place, silver medalist(s)

=== Mixed ===
Mixed doubles

Athlete	R16	Quarterfinal	Semifinal	Final	Rank
Pranav Chopra / N. Sikki Reddy	Bye	Ratnajit Tamang / Sara Devi Tamang Nepal (NEP) 21–9 21–10 W		Manu Attri / Ashwini Ponnappa India (IND) 30–29 21–17 W	1st place, gold medalist(s)
Manu Attri / Ashwini Ponnappa	Bye	Shabar Hussain / Saima Wagas Pakistan (PAK) 21–7 21–4 W		Pranav Chopra / N. Sikki Reddy India (IND) 29–30 17–21 L	2nd place, silver medalist(s)

== Boxing ==
=== Men ===
Athlete	Event	Quarterfinals	Semifinals	Finals	Rank
L. Devendro Singh	49Kg	Tashi Wangdi Bhutan (BHU) 3–0 W	Thiwanka Ranasinghe Sri Lanka (SRI) 3–0 W	Mohib Ulla Pakistan (PAK) 2–1 W	1st place, gold medalist(s)
Madan Lal	52Kg	Prem Choudhary Nepal (NEP) 3–0 W	Nazari Mohammad Arif; Afghanistan (AFG)2–1 W	Mohammad Syed Asif Pakistan (PAK) 3–0 W	1st place, gold medalist(s)
Shiva Thapa	56Kg	Shreshtha Dinesh Nepal (NEP) 3–0 W	Mohammad Ohiduzzaman Bangladesh (BAN) 3–0 W	W Ruwan Thilina Sri Lanka (SRI) 3–0 W	1st place, gold medalist(s)
Dheeraj Rangi	60Kg	Sonam Tshewang Bhutan (BHU) 3–0 W	Nooristani Khibar; Afghanistan (AFG)3–0 W	Ahmed Ali Pakistan (PAK) 3–0 W	1st place, gold medalist(s)
Manoj Kumar	64Kg	Bye	Tshering Wangchuk Bhutan (BHU) 3–0 W	Dinidu Saparamadu Sri Lanka (SRI) 3–0 W	1st place, gold medalist(s)
Mandeep Jangra	69Kg	Arshad Hussain Pakistan (PAK) 3–0 W	Ruwangala Gedra Sisira Sri Lanka (SRI) 3–0 W	Rahemi Alla Dad; Afghanistan (AFG)3–0 W	1st place, gold medalist(s)
Vikas Krishnan	75Kg	Jony Jewel Ahmed Bangladesh (BAN) W (TKO)	Folad S Wali Shah Ali; Afghanistan (AFG)3–0 W	Tanveer Ahmed Pakistan (PAK) 3–0 W	1st place, gold medalist(s)

=== Women ===
Athlete	Event	Quarterfinals	Semifinals	Finals	Rank
M. C. Marykom	51Kg	Bye	Akter Shamina Bangladesh (BAN) W (TKO)	K Anusha Dilrukshi Sri Lanka (SRI) W (TKO)	1st place, gold medalist(s)
L. Sarita Devi	60Kg	Akter Saki Bangladesh (BAN) W (TKO)	Rana Saraswati Nepal (NEP) 3–0 W	M Vidushika Prabadhi Sri Lanka (SRI) 3–0 W	1st place, gold medalist(s)
Pooja Rani Bohra	75Kg	Sunar Sangita Nepal (NEP) W (TKO)	Javed Sofiya Pakistan (PAK) W (TKO)	Nilanthi Andaraweer Sri Lanka (SRI) W (TKO)	1st place, gold medalist(s)

== Cycling ==
=== Women ===
Road:

Women's 30 Km Individual time trial

Athlete	Finish Time	Final Time	Rank
Bidayuluxmi Tourangbam	1::11:24.573	49:24.573	1st place, gold medalist(s)
Chaoba Devi Eangbam	1::05:31.311	49:31.311	2nd place, silver medalist(s)

Women's 40 km Criterium Individual

Athlete	Points	Rank
Lidiyamol Sunny Menamparambil	30	1st place, gold medalist(s)
Manorama Devi Tongbram	26	2nd place, silver medalist(s)
Suyena Puthenpurayil	9	4th
Bidyaluxmi Tourangbam	2	8th

Women's 40 Km Team time trial

Athletes	Finish Time	Final Time	Ranking
Bidayuluxmi Tourangbam	1:05:23.52	0:59:23.52	1st place, gold medalist(s)
Chaoba Devi Eangbam	1:05:23.52	0:59:23.52	1st place, gold medalist(s)
G Manisha	1:05:23.52	0:59:23.52	1st place, gold medalist(s)
Rutuja Satpute	1:05:23.52	0:59:23.52	1st place, gold medalist(s)

Women's 80 Km Individual Road Race

Athletes	Finish Time	Rank
Bidayuluxmi Tourangbam	2:30:55.350	1st place, gold medalist(s)
Lidiyamol Sunny Menamparambil	2:30:55.690	2nd place, silver medalist(s)
Geethu Raj N	2:30:55.900	3rd place, bronze medalist(s)
Sayona Puthenpuayil	NA	5th
Manorama Devi Tongbram	NA	8th
Rutuja Satpute	NA	22nd

=== Men ===
Track:

Men's 40 Km Individual time trial

Athlete	Finish Time	Final Time	Rank
Arvind Pawar	1::08:28.800	0::52:28.800	1st place, gold medalist(s)
Manjeet Singh	1::16:01.183	0::54:01.183	2nd place, silver medalist(s)

Men's 60km Criterium Individual

Athlete	Points	Rank
Pankaj Kumar	21	3rd place, bronze medalist(s)
Ganesh Pawar	20	4th
Dilawar	8	6th
Abhinandan Bhosale	7	7th

Men's 70 Km Team time trial

Athletes	Finish Time	Final Time	Rank
Arvind Pawar	1:37:37.840	1:29:37.840	1st place, gold medalist(s)
Manjeet Singh	1:37:37.840	1:29:37.840	1st place, gold medalist(s)
Deepak Kumar Rahi	1:37:37.840	1:29:37.840	1st place, gold medalist(s)
Manohar Lal Bishnoi	1:37:37.840	1:29:37.840	1st place, gold medalist(s)

Men's 100 Km Individual Road Race

Athlete	Finish Time	Rank
Pankaj Kumar	NA	2nd place, silver medalist(s)
Manjeet Singh	NA	5th
Ganesh Pawar	NA	9th
Arvind Pawar	NA	16th
Deepak Kumar Rahi	NA	18th
Abhinandan Bhosale	DNF	DNF

== Field hockey ==
=== Men ===
- Vikas Dahiya
- Pankaj Kumar Rajak
- Gaganpreet Singh
- Chiyanna AB
- Sukhmanjeet Singh
- Nilam Sanjip Xess
- Ajitesh Roy
- Gurbaj Singh
- Vikas Chaudhary
- Mangal Singh Chahal
- Manpreet Singh
- Ajay Yadav
- Ajit Kumar Pandey
- Gagandeep Singh
- PL Thimmanna
- Mandeep Antil
- Pradhan Sommanna P.
- Mohd Umar
- Anup Amarpal Valmiki

Teams	Pld	W	D	L	GF	GA	GD	Rank
Pakistan (PAK)	3	3	0	0	11	1	10	1st
India (IND)	3	2	0	1	8	3	5	2nd
Bangladesh (BAN)	3	1	0	2	3	10	−7	3rd
Sri Lanka (SRI)	3	0	0	3	8	0	−8	4th

7 February
20:00

India	4–1	Bangladesh
Pradhan Somanna 10' FG; Gaganpreet Singh 27' PC; Nilam Xess 30' PC; Mohammad Umar 69' FG		Milon Hossain 42' FG

8 February
15:00

India	1–2	Pakistan
Mandeep Antil 53' FG		Muhammad Arslan Qadir11' FG, 37' FG

10 February
20:00

India	3–0	Sri Lanka
Gagandeep Singh 11' FG; Gaganpreet Singh 34' PC, 64' PC

12 February Final
20:00

India	0–1 L (silver)	Pakistan
		Rehman 35' FG

=== Women ===
- Yogita Bali
- Sonal Minz
- Jaspreet Kaur
- Renuka Yadav
- Gurjit Kaur
- Hnialum Lalruatfeli
- Sushila Chanu
- M. N. Ponnamma
- Ritu Rani
- Deepika
- Sonica
- Preeti Dubey
- Shyama Tirgam
- Jyoti Gupta
- Punam Barla
- Rani Rampal
- Neha Goyal
- Soundarya Yendala

Preliminary

Team	Pld	W	L	D	GF	GA	GD	Rank
India (IND)	2	2	0	0	36	1	35	1ST
Sri Lanka (SRI)	2	1	1	0	16	12	4	2nd
Nepal (NEP)	2	0	2	0	0	39	−39	3rd

7 February
15:00

India	24–0	Nepal
Rani 2' 46' 58'; Jaspreet Kaur 4' 35' 56'; Barla7' 42' 43' 51'; Neha14' 22' 70+'; Yendala15' 52' 62' 64'; Gurjeet Kaur 21' 41'; Preeti 23' 29'; Deepika 53' 62' 67'

8 February
15:00

India	12–1	Sri Lanka
Rani 4' FG; Jaspreet Kaur 8' PC, 32' PC, 38' FG, 42' PS, 57' PC; Sonika13' FG; Yendala14' FG, 27' FG; Jyoti19' FG; Deepika47' FG; Gurjeet Kaur65' PC		P. A. C. D. Premasiri 58' FG

10 February Final
15:00

India	10–0 W (gold)	Sri Lanka
Rani 2' 4' 56' FG; Preeti 8' FG; Yendala 21' FG 64 PC ' Barla 29' PC; Deepika 31' FG; Ritu Rani 47' PC; Jaspreet Kaur 68' PC

== Football ==
=== Men ===
Group-A

Date		Score		Result
6 February 2016	India (IND)	0–1	Sri Lanka (SRI); Zarwan Johar 12'	Lost
10 February 2016	India (IND); Udanta Singh 4' 31' + Pritam Kotal 11'	3–2	Maldives (MDV); Muruthala Adnan 9' Pritam Kotal 59' (Own Goal)	Win

Semifinal

Date		Score		Result
13 February 2016	India (IND); Udanta Singh 22' Jerry Mawihmingthanga 40' Jayesh Rane 65'	3–0	Bangladesh (BAN)	Win

Final

Date		Score		Result
14 February 2016	India (IND); Holicharan Nazary 31' (pen.)	1–2	Nepal (NEP)Prakash Thapa 66' Nawayug Shreshtha 72'	Lost

=== Women ===
Goalkeepers: Aditi Chauhan, Roshini Devi, Panthoi Chanu,

Defenders: Ashalata Devi, Radharani Devi, Manisa Panna, Supriya Routray, Umapati Devi, Dalima Chibber,

Midfielders: Bembem Devi, Premi Devi, Sangita Basfore, Margaret Devi, Sasmita Malik, Prameshwori Devi, Sanju,

Forwards: Bala Devi, Dangmei Grace, Kamala Devi, Pyari Xaxa

Group Matches

Date		Score		Result
5 February 2016	India (IND)	0–0	Maldives (MDV)	Draw
9 February 2016	India (IND); Hasara Dilrangi 24' (own goal) Dangmei Grace 45+1' 58'; Kamala Devi 60' Sasmita Malik 73' (pen.)	5–0	Sri Lanka (SRI)	Win
11 February 2016	India (IND)	0–0	Nepal (NEP)	Draw

Semifinal

Date		Score		Result
13 February 2016	India (IND); Kamala Devi 6' 37' Bala Devi 13' 75' Sanju 74'	5–1	Bangladesh (BAN); Sabina Khatun 65'	Win

Final

Date		Score		Result
14 February 2016	India (IND)Kamala Devi 31' 55' Sushmita Malik 71' Ashalata Devi 78'	4–0	Nepal (NEP)	Win

== Handball ==
=== Men ===
Date	Opponent	1st Half	2nd Half	Final Score	Result
10 February	Sri Lanka (SRI); Group B	18–8	30–8	48–16	Win
12 February	Bangladesh (BAN); Group B	22–10	18–7	40–17	Win
14 February	Nepal (NEP); Semifinal	28–15	23–8	51–23	Win
15 February	Pakistan (PAK) Final	15–11	17–20	32–31	Win

=== Women ===
Date	Opponent	1st Half	2nd Half	Final Score	Result
12 February	Nepal (NEP); Group A	20–8	27–12	47–20	Win
13 February	Sri Lanka (SRI); Group A	35–5	35–5	70–10	Win
14 February	Pakistan (PAK); Semifinal	26–11	18–12	44–23	Win
15 February	Bangladesh (BAN) Final	24–13	21–12	45–25	Win

== Judo ==
=== Men ===
Athlete	Event	Quarterfinal	Semifinal	Final	Rank
Bupinder Singh	−60Kg	Bye	Ngawang Namgyel Bhutan (BHU) 101–000 W	Ali Popalzai; Afghanistan (AFG) 001–000 W	1st place, gold medalist(s)
Jasleen Singh Saini	−66Kg	Bye	Roshan Madusanka Thenne Gedara Sri Lanka (SRI) 110–000 W	M. Aryan; Afghanistan (AFG) 2–0 W	1st place, gold medalist(s)
Manjeet Nandal	−73Kg	Tandin Wangchuk Bhutan (BHU) 101–000 W	Imtiaz Hussain Pakistan (PAK) 010–000 W	RCN D Sri Lanka (SRI) 001–000 W	1st place, gold medalist(s)
Karanjit Singh Maan	−81Kg	Md.Habibur Rehman Bangladesh (BAN) 100–000 W	Qaiser Khan Pakistan (PAK) 111–000 W	Faiz zada Ajmal; Afghanistan (AFG) 101–000 W	1st place, gold medalist(s)
Avtar Singh	−90Kg	Sanjay Mahrjan Nepal (NEP) 010–000 W	Mhd. jahagir Alam Bangladesh (BAN) 101–000 W	M. Kakar; Afghanistan (AFG) 101–001 W	1st place, gold medalist(s)
Shubham Kumar	−100Kg	Bye	Mhd. Mamunur Rashid Bangladesh (BAN) 001–000 W	Hussain Shah Pakistan (PAK) 000–100 L	2nd place, silver medalist(s)

=== Women ===
Athlete	Event	Round Robin	Quarterfinal / Round Robin	Semifinal / Round Robin	Final / Round Robin	Rank
L. Shushila Devi	−48Kg	NIL	Bye	M. P. Sandamali Sri Lanka (SRI) 100–000 W	Ashiq Humara Pakistan (PAK) 001–000 W	1st place, gold medalist(s)
T, Kalpana Devi	−52Kg	Thamida Tabassum Jerin Bangladesh (BAN) 010–000 W	Iran Shahzadi Pakistan (PAK) 100–000 W	H. M. K. T. Karunarathne Sri Lanka (SRI) 100–000 W	Lila Adhikari Nepal (NEP) 100–000 W	1st place, gold medalist(s)
Angom Anita Chanu	−57Kg	Singma Pru Marma Bangladesh (BAN) 100–000 W	K.L.M.P. Liyange Sri Lanka (SRI) 100–000 W	Manita Pradhan Shreshta Nepal (NEP) 100–000 W	Shumaila Gull Pakistan (PAK) 001–000 W	1st place, gold medalist(s)
Huidrom Sunibala Devi	−63Kg	Mashih Abreen Pakistan (PAK) 100–000 W	Dousuising Cho Kanta Bangladesh (BAN) 100–000 W	DYL Wijewardene Sri Lanka (SRI) 100–000 W	Phupu Lahmu Khatri Nepal (NEP) 010–001 W	2nd place, silver medalist(s)
Pooja	−70Kg	NIL	Bye	W A P R J Jayarathne Sri Lanka (SRI) 101–000 W	Beenesh Khan Bangladesh (BAN) 101–000 W	1st place, gold medalist(s)
Aruna	−78Kg	NIL	W G L D Jayawardhana Sri Lanka (SRI) 101–000 W	Punam Shreshtha Nepal (NEP) 101–000 W	Fouzia Mumtaz Pakistan (PAK) 000–010 L	2nd place, silver medalist(s)

== Kabaddi ==
=== Men ===
Date	Opponent	1st Half	2nd Half	Score
12 February	Nepal (NEP)	19–11	28–12	47–23 W
12 February	Sri Lanka (SRI)	19–12	16–9	35–21 W
13 February	Bangladesh (BAN)	16–7	14–10	30–17 W
13 February	Pakistan (PAK)	9–7	0–1	9–8 W
14 February	Bangladesh (BAN) Semifinal	15–3	14–6	29–9 W
15 February	Pakistan (PAK) Final	5–5	4–2	9–7 W

=== Women ===
Date	Opponent	1st Half	2nd Half	Score
11 February	Nepal (NEP)	32–6	19–11	51–17 W
12 February	Sri Lanka (SRI)	18–7	19–6	37–13 W
13 February	Pakistan (PAK)	29–15	27–8	56–23 W
13 February	Bangladesh (BAN)	23–5	20–6	43–11 W
14 February	Nepal (NEP) Semifinal	25–5	20–10	45–15 W
15 February	Bangladesh (BAN)Final	21–7	15–5	36–12 W

== Kho-Kho ==
=== Men ===
Date	Opponent	1st Inning	2nd Inning	Score	Capton (Naresh sawant)
6 February	Nepal (NEP)	23–11	0–10	23–21 W	
7 February	Sri Lanka (SRI)	16–9	3–8	19–17 W	
7 February	Pakistan (PAK)	23–7	0–10	23–17 W	
8 February	Bangladesh (BAN)	10–4	11–9	21–13 W	
8 February	Nepal (NEP) Semifinal	22–5	0–5	22–10 W	
9 February	Bangladesh (BAN) Final	15–7	22–5	37–14 W	

=== Women ===
Date	Opponent	1st Inning	2nd Inning	Score	Captain (Sarika kale)
6 February	Sri Lanka (SRI)	16–6	0–8	16–14 W	
7 February	Nepal (NEP)	15–9	0–3	15–12 W	
7 February	Pakistan (PAK)	16–8	0–6	16–14 W	
8 February	Bangladesh (BAN)	18–4	0–8	18–12 W	
8 February	Sri Lanka (SRI) Semifinal	24–5	0–9	24–14 W	
9 February	Bangladesh (BAN) Final	16–8	0–6	16–14 W	

== Shooting ==
=== Men ===
Athlete	Event	Qualification		Final	
Athlete		Score	Rank	Score	Rank
Omkar Singh	50 m Pistol Men	550-9x	1st Q	86.1	7th
P.N. Prakash	50 m Pistol Men	540-7x	2nd Q	146.9	4th
Om Prakash	50 m Pistol Men	532-4x	4th Q	187.3	2nd place, silver medalist(s)
Omkar Singh P.N. Prakash Om Prakash	50 m Pistol Men Team	NIL	NIL	1622	1st place, gold medalist(s)
Gagan Narang	50 m Rifle Prone Men	628.9	1st Q	203.7	2nd place, silver medalist(s)
Singh Chain	50 m Rifle Prone Men	625.7	2nd Q	204.6	1st place, gold medalist(s)
Rathod Surendra Singh	50 m Rifle Prone Men	616.9	3rd Q	140.6	5th
Gagan Narang Singh Chain Rathod Surendra Singh	50 M Rifle Prone Men Team	NIL	NIL	1871.5	1st place, gold medalist(s)
Samaresh Jung	25 m Center Fire Pistol Men	NIL	NIL	580	1st place, gold medalist(s)
Tamang Pemba	25 m Center Fire Pistol Men	NIL	NIL	579	2nd place, silver medalist(s)
Vijay Kumar	25 m Center Fire Pistol Men	NIL	NIL	577	3rd place, bronze medalist(s)
Samaresh Jung Vijay Kumar Pemba Tamang	25 m Center Fire Pistol Men Team	NIL	NIL	1736	1st place, gold medalist(s)
Kumar Neeraj	25 m Standard Pistol Men	NIL	NIL	569-7X	1st place, gold medalist(s)
Singh Gurpreet	25 m Standard Pistol Men	NIL	NIL	566-11X	2nd place, silver medalist(s)
Singh Mahender	25 m Standard Pistol Men	NIL	NIL	563-12X	3rd place, bronze medalist(s)
Kumar Neeraj Singh Gurpreet Singh Mahender	25 m Standard Pistol Men Team	NIL	NIL	1698-30X	1st place, gold medalist(s)
Chain Singh	10 m Air Rifle Men	621.9	2nd Q	204.6	1st place, gold medalist(s)
Gagan Narang	10 m Air Rifle Men	623.2	1st Q	182	3rd place, bronze medalist(s)
Khan Imran Hasan	10 m Air Rifle Men	618.3	1st Q	162.1	4th
Chain Singh Gagan Narang Khan Imran Hasan	10 m Air Rifle Men Team	NIL	NIL	1863.4	1st place, gold medalist(s)
Omkar Singh	10 m Air Men Pistol	583-21X	1st Q	198.8	1st place, gold medalist(s)
Gurpreet Singh	10 m Air Men Pistol	576-20X	2nd Q	115.1	6th
Jitendra Vibhute	10 m Air Men Pistol	576-14X	3rd Q	175.1	3rd place, bronze medalist(s)
Omkar Singh Gurpreet Singh Jitendra Vibhute	10 m Air Pistol Men Team	NIL	NIL	1735-55X	1st place, gold medalist(s)
Chain Singh	50 m Rifle 3 Position Men	1170-71X	1st Q	453.3	1st place, gold medalist(s)
Gagan Narang	50 m Rifle 3 Position Men	1167-54X	2nd Q	450.3	2nd place, silver medalist(s)
Surendra Singh Rathore	50 m Rifle 3 Position Men	1153-49X	3rd Q	387.2	7th
Chain Singh Gagan Narang Surendra Singh Rathore	50 m Rifle 3 Position Men Team	NIL	NIL	3490	1st place, gold medalist(s)
Vijay Kumar	25 m Rapid Fire Pistol Men	572-15X	1st Q	20	3rd place, bronze medalist(s)
Gurpreet Singh	25 m Rapid Fire Pistol Men	571-20X	2nd Q	28	1st place, gold medalist(s)
Akshay Suhas Ashaputre	25 m Rapid Fire Pistol Men	559-10X	4th Q	9	6th
Vijay Kumar Gurpreet Singh Akshay Suhas Ashaputre	25 m Rapid Fire Pistol Men Team	NIL	NIL	1702-45X	1st place, gold medalist(s)

=== Women ===
Athlete	Event	Qualification		Final	
Athlete		Score	Rank	Score	Rank
Apurvi Chandela	10m Air Rifle Women	419.8	1st Q	209	1st place, gold medalist(s)
Pooja Ghatkar	10m Air Rifle Women	417.7	2nd Q	185.9	3rd place, bronze medalist(s)
Koshy Elizabeth Susan	10m Air Rifle Women	411	3rd Q	207.1	2nd place, silver medalist(s)
Apurvi Chandela Pooja Ghatkar Koshy Elizabeth Susan	10m Air Rifle Women Team	NIL	NIL	1248.5	1st place, gold medalist(s)
Gangulee Kuheli	50m Rifle Prone Women	NIL	NIL	619.9	1st place, gold medalist(s)
Lajja Gauswami	50m Rifle Prone Women	NIL	NIL	608.2	2nd place, silver medalist(s)
Jung Anuja	50m Rifle Prone Women	NIL	NIL	607.5	3rd place, bronze medalist(s)
Gangulee Kuheli Lajja Gauswami Jung Anuja	50m Rifle Prone Women Team	NIL	NIL	1835.6	1st place, gold medalist(s)
Anjum Modgil	50m Rifle 3 Position Women	NIL	NIL	452.2	1st place, gold medalist(s)
Koshy Elizabeth Susan	50m Rifle 3 Position Women	NIL	NIL	451.9	2nd place, silver medalist(s)
Lajja Gauswami	50m Rifle 3 Position Women	NIL	NIL	429.9	3rd place, bronze medalist(s)
Anjum Modgil Koshy Elizabeth Susan Lajja Gauswami	50m Rifle 3 Position Women Team	NIL	NIL	1726-69X	1st place, gold medalist(s)
Rahi Sarnobat	25m Pistol Women	NIL	NIL	584-16X	1st place, gold medalist(s)
Anisa Sayyed	25m Pistol Women	NIL	NIL	582-20X	2nd place, silver medalist(s)
Annu Raj Singh	25m Pistol Women	NIL	NIL	575-16X	3rd place, bronze medalist(s)
Rahi Sarnobat Anisa Sayyed Annu Raj Singh	25m Pistol Women Team	NIL	NIL	1741-52X	1st place, gold medalist(s)
Heena Sidhu	10m Air Pistol Women	386-10X	1st Q	192.5	2nd place, silver medalist(s)
Yashashwini Singh Deswal	10m Air Pistol Women	374-7X	2nd Q	171.3	3rd place, bronze medalist(s)
Shweta Singh	10m Air Pistol Women	373-8X	3rd Q	194.4	1st place, gold medalist(s)
Heena Sidhu Yashashwini Singh Deswal Shweta Singh	10m Air Pistol Women Team	NIL	NIL	1133-25X	1st place, gold medalist(s)

== Squash ==
=== Men ===
Saurav Ghosal, Harinder Pal Sandhu, Kush Kumar and Ravi Dixit

Individual

Athlete	Pre-Quarterfinals	Quarterfinals	Semifinals	Finals	Rank	Rank Upgrade(After Doping Test)
Saurav Ghosal	Bye	Md Shumon Bangladesh (BAN) 11–5 11–1 11–3 W	Farhan Zaman Pakistan (PAK) 4–11 5–11 12–10 5–11 L	Did Not Advance	3rd place, bronze medalist(s)	2nd place, silver medalist(s)
Harinder Pal Sandhu	Bye	Md Shamil Wakeel Sri Lanka (SRI) 11–3 11–8 11–3 W	Nasir Iqbal Pakistan (PAK) 7–11 14–12 7–11 6–11 L	Did Not Advance	3rd place, bronze medalist(s)	2nd place, silver medalist(s)

Team

Date	Opponent	Score	Match-1	Match-2	Match-3
8 February 2016	Nepal (NEP) Round Robin	3–0 W	Saurav Ghosal vs Arhant Keshar Simha 9–11 11–6 11–6 W	Kush Kumar vs Hira B Thapa 11–5 11–4 11–8 W	Ravi Dixit vs Sujan Jwarchan 11–4 11–6 11–6 W
9 February 2016	Sri Lanka (SRI)Round Robin	3–0 W	Saurav Ghosal vs Ravindu Laksiri 13–11 11–5 11–8 W	Kush Kumar vs Shamil Wakeel 10–12 11–3 11–9 11–9 W	Ravi Dixit vs Dilshan Gunwardane 11–7 11–6 11–9 W
9 February 2016	Bangladesh (BAN)Round Robin	3–0 W	Saurav Ghosal vs Md Shumon 11–2 11–0 11–2 W	Kush Kumar vs Shahid Islam 11–5 11–6 11–7 W	Ravi Dixit vs Rajon Kumar 11–2 11–8 11–8 W
10 February 2016	Pakistan (PAK) Round Robin	2–1 W	Saurav Ghosal vs Nasir Iqbal 11–7 11–8 11–7 W	Kush Kumar vs Farhan Zaman 11–3 11–8 12–10 W	Ravi Dixit vs Danish Atlas Khan 3–11 8–11 11–6 6–11 L

=== Women ===
Joshna Chinappa, Dipika Karthik, Sunayna Kuruvilla and Akanksha Salunkhe

Individual

Athlete	Pre-Quarterfinals	Quarterfinals	Semifinals	Finals	Rank
Joshna Chinappa	Bye	Krishna Thapa Nepal (NEP) 11–6 11–4 11–4 W	Sadia Gul Pakistan (PAK) 11–7 11–9 11–7 W	Maria Toorpaki Wazeer Pakistan (PAK) 10–12 11–7 11–9 11–7	1st place, gold medalist(s)
Sunayna Kuruvilla	Bye	Mihilya Methsarani Sri Lanka (SRI) 11–6 9–11 11–4 5–11 10–12 L	Did Not Advance		

Team

Date	Opponent	Score	Match-1	Match-2	Match-3
8 February	Nepal (NEP) Round Robin	3–0 W	Dipika Karthik vs Bhavana Sunwar 11–2 11–3 11–9 W	Sunayna Kuruvilla vs Krishna Thapa 11–3 11–1 11–0 W	Akanksha Salunkhe vs Bipana Blon 11–2 11–5 11–6 W
9 February	Sri Lanka (SRI)Round Robin	3–0 W	Dipika Karthik vs Mihilya Methsarani 11–4 11–7 11–7 W	Sunayna Kuruvilla vs Naduni Gunawardane 11–6 11–3 11–3 W	Akanksha Salunkhe vs Fathima Issadeen 11–1 11–3 11–4 W
10 February 2016	Pakistan (PAK) Round Robin	2–0 W	Dipika Karthik vs Sadia Gul Not Played	Joshna Chinappa vs Maria Toorpaki Wazir 11–8 4–11 11–5 11–9 W	Sunayna Kuruvilla vs Sammer Anjum 10–12 11–7 11–7 8–11 11–6 W

== Swimming ==
=== Men ===
Athlete	Event	Final	
Athlete	Event	Time	Rank
Saurabh Sangvekar	200 m Freestyle	1:53:03	2nd place, silver medalist(s)
Sandeep Sejwal	200 m Breastroke	2:20:66 GR	1st place, gold medalist(s)
Supriyo Mondal	100 m Butterfly	55:86	2nd place, silver medalist(s)
Neil Contractor, S P Nair Sharma, Sahil Chopra, Anshul Kothari,	4x100 m Freestyle relay	3:30:78	2nd place, silver medalist(s)
Sandeep Sejwal	100m Breaststroke	1:03:14 GR	1st place, gold medalist(s)
Puneet Rana	100m Breaststroke	1:03:80	2nd place, silver medalist(s)
Sajan Prakash	1500m Freestyle	15:55:3 GR	1st place, gold medalist(s)
Saurabh Sangvekar	1500m Freestyle	16:13:2	2nd place, silver medalist(s)
Neil Contractor	50m Freestyle	24:06	5th
Virdhawal Khade	50m Freestyle	23:54	2nd place, silver medalist(s)
M Arvind	200m Backstroke	2:08:00	1st place, gold medalist(s)
Sanu Debnath	400m Individual Medley	4:40:85	2nd place, silver medalist(s)
P. S. Madhu	100 Backstroke	57:94	1st place, gold medalist(s)
Sethu Manickavel	100 Backstroke	59.47	2nd place, silver medalist(s)
Sandeep Sejwal	50m Breaststroke	28:79	1st place, gold medalist(s)
Puneet Rana	50m Breaststroke	29:11	2nd place, silver medalist(s)
Saurabh Sangvekar	400m Freestyle	3:58:84GR	1st place, gold medalist(s)
Sajan Prakash	400m Freestyle	4:03:79	2nd place, silver medalist(s)
Sajan Prakash	200m Butterfly	2:03:02	1st place, gold medalist(s)
P. S. Madhu	50m Backstroke	26:86	1st place, gold medalist(s)
M Arvind	50m Backstroke	27:18	2nd place, silver medalist(s)
Saurab Sangvekar, Raj Bhanwadia, Neil Contractor, Sajan Prakash	4x200m Freestyle Relay	07:43.42GR	1st place, gold medalist(s)
Sanu Debnath	200m Individual Medley	2:11:65	2nd place, silver medalist(s)
Neil Contractor	100m Freestyle	52.47	4th
Virdhawal Khade	50m Butterfly	24:54 GR	1st place, gold medalist(s)
Anshul Kothari	50m Butterfly	25:24	2nd place, silver medalist(s)
P.S.Madhu, Sandeep Sejwal, Supriyo Mondal, Anshul Kothari	4x100m Medley Relay	3:49:78	1st place, gold medalist(s)

=== Women ===
Athlete	Event	Final	
Athlete	Event	Time	Rank
Shivani Kataria	200 m Freestyle	2:08:68	1st place, gold medalist(s)
Kalyani Saxena	200 m Breaststroke	2:51:2	4th
Harshita Jayram	200 m Breaststroke	2:51:6	5th
Damini Gowda	100 m Butterfly	1:04:9	1st place, gold medalist(s)
Avantika Chavan, V Malvika, Maana Patel, Shivani Kataria,	4x100 m Freestyle relay	4:01:95	1st place, gold medalist(s)
Chahat Arora	100m Breaststroke	1:18:77	3rd place, bronze medalist(s)
Harshita Jayaram	100m Breaststroke	1:19:93	6th
Maana Patel	200m Backstroke	2:22:06	2nd place, silver medalist(s)
Sayani Ghosh	400m Individual Medley	5:14:51 GR	1st place, gold medalist(s)
Shraddha Sudhir	400m Individual Medley	5:23:32	2nd place, silver medalist(s)
V Malvika	800m Freestyle	9:19:48	1st place, gold medalist(s)
Maana Patel	100m Backstroke	1:06:00	2nd place, silver medalist(s)
Jyotsna Pansare	100m Backstroke	1:07:42	4th
Chahat Arora	50m Breaststroke	36:15	4th
Maana Patel	50m Freestyle	27:44	3rd place, bronze medalist(s)
Avantika Chavan	50m Freestyle	27:64	4th
V Malvika	400m Freestyle Women	4:30:08	1st place, gold medalist(s)
Shivani Kataria	400m Freestyle Women	4:38:43	2nd place, silver medalist(s)
Damini Gowda	200m Butterfly	2:21:12	1st place, gold medalist(s)
Maana Patel	50m Backstroke	30:06	2nd place, silver medalist(s)
Shraddha Sudhir, V Malvika, Damini Gowda, Shivani Kataria	4x200m Freestyle Relay	08:55.98	1st place, gold medalist(s)
Shraddha Sudhir	200m Individual Medley	2:31:18	1st place, gold medalist(s)
Shivani Kataria	100m Freestyle	1:00:14	3rd place, bronze medalist(s)
Maana Patel	100m Freestyle	1:01:25	4th
Jyotsna Pansare	50m Butterfly	29:19	1st place, gold medalist(s)
Avantika Chavan	50m Butterfly	29:67	2nd place, silver medalist(s)
Maana Patel Chahat Arora Damini Gowda, Shivani Kataria	4x100m Medley Relay	4:30:91	1st place, gold medalist(s)

== Table tennis ==
=== Men ===
1. Anthony Amalraj,
2. Sathiyan Gnanasekaran,
3. Devesh Karia,
4. Sanil Sankar Shetty
5. Sudhanshu Grover

Team:

Date	Opponent	Score	Match-1	Match-2	Match-3	Match-4	Match-5
6 February 2016	Bangladesh (BAN); Group-A	3–0 W	Sathiyan Ganasekaran vs Mahbub Billah 11–5 11–7 11–6 W	Sanil Shankar Shetty vs Manash Choudhary 11–7 13–11 8–11 11–8 W	Sudhanshu Grover vs Mohammed Zaved 6–11 11–5 11–6 11–4 W		
6 February 2016	Nepal (NEP); Group-A	3–0 W	Devesh Karia vs Deep Saun 11–7 11–1 11–5 W	Anthony Amalraj vs Shiv Sundar Gathe 2–11 11–7 11–5 11–6 W	Sudhanshu Grover vs Amar Lal Malla 11–7 11–5 5–11 12–10 W		
7 February 2016	Pakistan (PAK) Semifinal	3–0 W	Sathiyan Gunasekaran vs M Ramees 11–7 11–1 11–4 W	Anthony Amalraj vs Asim Qureshi 11–6 11–4 11–5 W	Devesh Karia vs Ali Sajad Faisal 11–7 11–3 11–8 W		
7 February 2016	Sri Lanka (SRI) Final	3–0 W	Anthony Amalraj vs Udaya Ranasinghe 11–9 13–11 6–11 11–8 W	Sathiyan Gunasekaran vs Rohan Sirisena 11–3 11–3 11–3 W	Sanil Shankar Shetty vs Nirmala Jayasinghe 8–11 11–3 11–7 13–11 W		

Singles:

Athlete	Semifinal	Final	Rank
Anthony Amalraj	Rohan Sirisena Sri Lanka (SRI) 11–9 11–4 11–3 11–7 W	Sathiyan Gunasekaran India (IND) 6–11 11–6 11–6 2–2(Retd) W	1st place, gold medalist(s)
Sathiyan Gunasekaran	Udaya Ranasinghe Sri Lanka (SRI) 11–5 14–12 12–10 11–6 W	Anthony Amalraj India (IND) 11–6 6–11 6–11 2–2(Retd.) L	2nd place, silver medalist(s)

Doubles:

Athlete	Semifinal	Final	Rank
Anthony Amalraj / Sanil Sankar Shetty	Rohan Sirisena / Chameern Ginge Sri Lanka (SRI) 11–8 14–12 11–9 W	Sathiyan Gunasekaran / Devesh Karia India (IND) 1–11 8–11 6–11 L	2nd place, silver medalist(s)
Sathiyan Gunasekaran / Devesh Karia	Udaya Ranasinghe / Nirmala Jayasinghe Sri Lanka (SRI) 11–7 11–4 11–4 W	Anthony Amalraj / Sanil Sankar Shetty India (IND) 11–1 11–8 11–6 W	1st place, gold medalist(s)

=== Women ===
1. Manika Batra,
2. Mouma Das,
3. Pooja Vijay Sahasrabudhe,
4. Madhurika Patkar
5. Shamini Kumaresan

Team:

Date	Opponent	Score	Match-1	Match-2	Match-3	Match-4	Match-5
6 February 2016	Maldives (MDV); Group A	3–0 W	Madhurika Patkar vs Nimaal Fathimal Jumana 11–6 11–4 11–8 W	Manika Batra vs Mohamed Mueena 11–8 11–4 11–3 W	Pooja Vijay Sahasrabudhe vs Nazeem Aishath Rafa 11–2 11–6 11–8 W		
6 February 2016	Pakistan (PAK); Group A	3–0 W	Mouma Das vs Rahila Kashif 11–7 11–3 11–4 W	Shamini Kumaresan vs Shabnam Bilal 11–1 11–5 11–7 W	Madhurika Patkar vs Ayesha Ansari 11–2 11–3 11–4 W		
7 February 2016	Bangladesh (BAN); Semifinal	3–0 W	Pooja Vijay Sahasrabudhe vs Moumita Alam 11–4 11–5 11–7 W	Shamini Kumaresan vs Rahima Akhter 11–3 11–5 11–5 W	Madhurika Patkar vs Snigaha Sultana 11–2 11–5 11–7		
7 February 2016	Pakistan (PAK) Final	3–0 W	Manika Batra vs Rahila Kashif 11–2 11–6 11–6 W	Mouma Das vs Shabnam Bilal 11–7 11–4 11–4 W	Shamini Kumaresan vs Ayesha Ansari 11–3 11–3 11–7 W		

Singles:

Athlete	Semifinal	Final	Rank
Manika Batra	Ishara Madhurangi Sri Lanka (SRI) 12–10 9–11 11–2 11–5 11–8 W	Mouma Das India (IND) 13–11, 10–12, 11–7, 11–13, 8–11, 13–11, 9–11	2nd place, silver medalist(s)
Mouma Das	Ruvini Kannangura Sri Lanka (SRI) 11–4 11–9 11–3 11–7 W	Manika Batra India (IND) 11–13 12–10 7–11 13–11 11–8 11–13 11–9	1st place, gold medalist(s)

Doubles:

Athlete	Semifinal	Final	Rank
Mouma Das / Shamini Kumaresan	Nabita Shrestha / Elina Maharjan Nepal (NEP) 11–4 11–6 11–7 W	Manika Batra / Pooja Vijay Sahasrabudhe India (IND) 7–11 11–13 5–11 L	2nd place, silver medalist(s)
Manika Batra / Pooja Vijay Sahasrabudhe	Ishara Madhurangi / Erandi Sri Lanka (SRI) 12–10 11–9 11–4 W	Mouma Das / Shamini Kumaresan India (IND) 11–7 13–11 11–5 W	1st place, gold medalist(s)

=== Mixed ===
Mixed doubles

Athlete	Semifinal	Final	Rank
Anthony Amalraj / Manika Batra	Udaya Ranasinghe / Ruvini Kannangura Sri Lanka (SRI) 11–7 10–12 13–11 11–6 W	Sathiyan Gunasekaran / Mouma Das India (IND) 11–5 4–11 11–7 8–11 12–10 W	1st place, gold medalist(s)
Sathiyan Gunasekaran / Mouma Das	Rohan Sirisena / Ishara Madhurang Sri Lanka (SRI) 11–4 11–13 11–6 11–5 W	Anthony Amalraj / Manika Batra India (IND) 5–11 11–4 7–11 11–8 10–12 L	2nd place, silver medalist(s)

== Taekwondo ==
=== Men ===
Athlete	Event	Semifinal	Final	Rank
Abrar Khan	−54 Kg	NA	Mohsen Razaei; Afghanistan (AFG) L	2nd place, silver medalist(s)
Gajendra Parihar	54–58 Kg	NA	Mahmood Haidari; Afghanistan (AFG) L	2nd place, silver medalist(s)
Naveen	63–68 Kg	NA	NA	3rd place, bronze medalist(s)
Manu George	68–74 Kg	NA	M Sharif Muradi; Afghanistan (AFG) L	2nd place, silver medalist(s)
Navjeet Maan	74–80 Kg	NA	Saksham Karki Nepal (NEP) W	1st place, gold medalist(s)
P. Anand	80–87 Kg	NA	Ramesh Hossani; Afghanistan (AFG) W	1st place, gold medalist(s)

=== Women ===
Athlete	Event	Semifinal	Final	Rank
Purva Dixit	46–49 Kg	NA	Y K Chaulagain Nepal (NEP) W	1st place, gold medalist(s)
Latika Bhandari	49–53 Kg	NA	Neema Gurung Nepal (NEP) W	1st place, gold medalist(s)
S Ramchiary	53–57 Kg	NA	NA	3rd place, bronze medalist(s)
Margerita Regi	57-62Kg	NA	Ayesha Shakya Nepal (NEP) W	1st place, gold medalist(s)

== Tennis ==
=== Men ===
Singles

Athletes	Round-1	Round-2	Semifinals	Finals	Rank
Saketh Myneni	Abdullah Faaih Fazeel Maldives (MDV) 6–1 6–0 W	Lal D Bangladesh (BAN) 6–0 6–1 W	Aisam Ul Haq Quereshi Pakistan (PAK) 6–2 6–1 W	Ramkumar Ramanathan India (IND) 5–7 2–6 L	2nd place, silver medalist(s)
Ramkumar Ramanathan	Samrakshyak Bajr. Nepal (NEP) 6–1 6–0 W	Aqeel Khan Pakistan (PAK) 6–3 6–3 W	Shamal Dissanayake Sri Lanka (SRI) 6–4 7–5 W	Saketh Myneni India (IND) 7–5 6–2 W	1st place, gold medalist(s)

Doubles

Athletes	Round-1	Round-2	Semifinals	Finals	Rank
Divij Sharan / Sanam Singh	Bye	Roy / Ram Bangladesh (BAN) 6–1 6–1 W	Godamanna H / Dassanayeke S Sri Lanka (SRI) 6–3 6–1 W	Ramkumar Ramanathan / Prashanth Vijay Sunder India (IND) 3–6 4–6 L	2nd place, silver medalist(s)
Ramkumar Ramanathan / Prashanth Vijay Sunder	Dipu Lal / Md. Anwar Hossain Bangladesh (BAN) 6–0 6–2 W	Aisam Qureshi / Aqeel Khan Pakistan (PAK) 6–4 6–1 W	Thengarajan D / De Silva Sri Lanka (SRI) 6–3 6–1 W	Divij Sharan / Sanam Singh India (IND) 6–3 6–4 W	1st place, gold medalist(s)

=== Women ===
Singles

Athletes	Round-1	Semifinals	Finals	Rank
Ankita Raina	Thisuri Molligoda Sri Lanka (SRI) 6–0 6–2 W	Sara Mansoor Pakistan (PAK) 6–1 6–1 W	Prerna Bhambri India (IND) 6–1 6–0 W	1st place, gold medalist(s)
Prerna Bhambri	Bibhuti Karki Nepal (NEP) 6–0 6–0 W	Ushna Suhail Pakistan (PAK) 6–1 6–2 W	Ankita Rana India (IND) 1–6 0–6 L	2nd place, silver medalist(s)

Doubles

Athletes	Round-1	Round-2	Semifinals	Finals	Rank
Prarthana Thombare / Sarmada Balu	Bye	Sara Mansoor / Iman Qureshi Pakistan (PAK) 6–0 6–2 W	Amritha Muttiah / Medhira Samarasinghe Sri Lanka (SRI) 6–1 6–1 W	Rishika Sunkura / Natasha Palha India (IND) 7–5 2–6 10–4 W	1st place, gold medalist(s)
Rishika Sunkura / Natasha Palha	Bye	Ushna Suhail / Sarah Mahboob Khan Pakistan (PAK) 6–1 6–2 W	Thisuri Molligoda / Nethmie Waduge Sri Lanka (SRI) 6–2 6–0 W	Prarthana Thombare / Sarmada Balu India (IND) 5–7 6–2 4–10 L	2nd place, silver medalist(s)

=== Mixed ===
Mixed doubles

Athletes	Round-1	Round-2	Semifinals	Finals	Rank
Ankita Raina / Divij Sharan	Bye	Ram R / Islam A Bangladesh (BAN) 6–2 6–1 W	Aisam Qureshi / Ushna Suhail Pakistan (PAK) 6–1 6–4 W	Prarthana Thombare / Sanam Singh India (IND) 6–2 7–6 W	1st place, gold medalist(s)
Prarthana Thombare / Sanam Singh	Bye	Magar S / Rawat I M Nepal (NEP) 6–0 6–0 W	Godamanna / Muttiah Sri Lanka (SRI) 6–3 6–1 W	Ankita Raina / Divij Sharan India (IND) 2–6 6–7 L	2nd place, silver medalist(s)

== Triathlon ==
=== Men ===
Individual

Athlete	Timing	Rank
Dilip Kumar	2:02:53	1st place, gold medalist(s)
Guru Datt	2:05:31	2nd place, silver medalist(s)

=== Women ===
Individual

Athlete	Timing	Rank
Pallawi Retiwala	1:11:57	1st place, gold medalist(s)
Pooja Chaurushi	1:12:26	2nd place, silver medalist(s)

=== Mixed ===
Mixed Relay

Athlete	Timing	Rank
Pallawi Retiwala Dilip Kumar Sorohni DeviI Thoudam Dhiraj Sawant	01:24:31	1st place, gold medalist(s)

== Volleyball ==
=== Men ===
1.G.R. Vaishnav,
2.Naveen Raja Jacob,
3.Ukkrapandian,
4.Lavmeet Kataria,
5.Karthik,
6.Prabagaran,
7.Prabakaran Pattani,
8.Hardeep Singh,
9.Gurinder Singh,
10.Vinit Kumar,
11.Ranjit Singh,
12.C. Jerome Vinith
Head coach: G.E. Sridharan.

Date		Score		Set-1	Set-2	Set-3	Set-4	Set-5	Result
6 February 2016	India (IND)	3–0	Nepal (NEP)	25–15	25–16	25–16			Win
7 February 2016	India (IND)	3–0	Sri Lanka (SRI)	25–19	25–18	25–19			Win
8 February 2016 Semifinal	India (IND)	3–0	Maldives (MDV)	25–17	25–20	25–19			Win
9 February 2016 Final	India (IND)	3–0	Sri Lanka (SRI)	25–19	25–22	28–26			Win

=== Women ===
1.Tiji Raju,
2.S. Rekha,
3.M. Sruthi,
4.K.S. Jini,
5.Anusri Ghosh,
6.K.S. Smisha,
7.Nirmal,
8.M.S. Poornima,
9.Preeti Singh,
10.Priyanka Khedkar,
11.Terin Antony,
12.P. Narmada
Head coach: R.P. Tailor

Date		Score		Set-1	Set-2	Set-3	Set-4	Set-5	Result
6 February 2016	India (IND)	3–0	Maldives (MDV)	25–9	25–9	25–10			Win
7 February 2016	India (IND)	3–0	Pakistan (PAK)	25–5	25–7	25–6			Win
8 February 2016 Semifinal	India (IND)	3–0	Nepal (NEP)	25–10	25–9	25–15			Win
9 February 2016 Final	India (IND)	3–0	Sri Lanka (SRI)	25–14	25–21	25–14			Win (gold)

== Weightlifting ==
=== Women ===
Athlete	Event	Snatch	Clean & Jerk	Total	Rank
Saikhom Mirabai Chanu	Women's 48 kg	79	90	169	1st place, gold medalist(s)
Harshdeep Kaur	Women's 53 kg	73	98	171	1st place, gold medalist(s)
Saraswati Raut	Women's 58 Kg	80	107	187	1st place, gold medalist(s)
Reena	Women's 63 Kg	89	NM	NM	NR
Rakhi Haler	Women's 69 Kg	86	108	194	1st place, gold medalist(s)
Kavita Devi	Women's 75 Kg	92	118	210	1st place, gold medalist(s)
Sushila Panwar	Women's 75+ Kg	88	110	198	1st place, gold medalist(s)

=== Men ===
Athlete	Event	Snatch	Clean & Jerk	Total	Rank
Guru Raja	Men's 56 kg	104	137	241	1st place, gold medalist(s)
Gopal Anbarasu	Men's 62 kg	110	NM	NM	NR
Sambo Lapung	Men's 69 kg	123	158	281	1st place, gold medalist(s)
Ajay Singh	Men's 77 Kg	136	169	305	1st place, gold medalist(s)
Vikas Thakur	Men's 85 Kg	140	160	300	1st place, gold medalist(s)
Pardeep Singh	Men's 94 Kg	145	186	331	1st place, gold medalist(s)
Victor Abilash Christopher	Men's 105 Kg	135	182	317	1st place, gold medalist(s)
Gurdeep Singh	Men's 105+ Kg	155	190	345	2nd place, silver medalist(s)

== Wrestling ==
=== Men ===
Athlete	Event	Opponent	Score	Opponent	Score	Opponent	Score	Opponent	Score	Result
Ravindra	57 Kg Freestyle	NIL	NIL	NIL	NIL	Faisal; Afghanistan (AFG)	11–0 W	Mohammad Bilal; Pakistan (PAK)	5–0 W	1st place, gold medalist(s)
Pradeep	61 Kg Freestyle	NIL	NIL	Rum Fernato; Sri Lanka (SRI)	11–0 W	Ali Mohd; Afghanistan (AFG)	12–2 W	Abdul Wahali; Pakistan (PAK)	10–0 W	1st place, gold medalist(s)
Rajneesh	65 Kg Freestyle	NIL	NIL	Zamir; Afghanistan (AFG)	10–0 W	W. M. C. Parera; Sri Lanka (SRI)	4–0 W	Nadar; Pakistan (PAK)	11–0 W	1st place, gold medalist(s)
Amit Kumar Dhankar	70 Kg Freestyle	TKS Madurunga; Sri Lanka (SRI)	10–0 W	Mohammed Ali Amzad; Bangladesh (BAN)	10–0 W	Malak Jan; Afghanistan (AFG)	10–0 W	Baijnath Yadav; Nepal (NEP)	10–0 W	1st place, gold medalist(s)
Pradeep	74 Kg Freestyle	NIL	NIL	NIL	NIL	B R Rathnayanka; Sri Lanka (SRI)	10–1 W	Mohd. Azad Butt; Pakistan (PAK)	6–3 W	1st place, gold medalist(s)
Gopal Yadav	86 Kg Freestyle	NIL	NIL	NIL	NIL	Mohammed A Rahman; Bangladesh (BAN)	11–0 W	Mohammad Imam; Pakistan (PAK)	4–10 L	2nd place, silver medalist(s)
Mausam Khatri	97 Kg Freestyle	NIL	NIL	AMPS Adikari; Sri Lanka (SRI)	4–0 W	Mohammad Umair; Pakistan (PAK)	12–0 W	Rajeb Naseri; Afghanistan (AFG)	12–2	1st place, gold medalist(s)
Mandeep	125 Kg Freestyle	R Rasoole; Afghanistan (AFG)	2–1 W	Zamam Anwar; Pakistan (PAK)	11–5 L	Mongno Marma; Bangladesh (BAN)	4–0 W	Satinra Prasad; Nepal (NEP)	7–0 W	2nd place, silver medalist(s)

=== Women ===
Athlete	Event	Opponent	Score	Opponent	Score	Opponent	Score	Result
Priyanka Singh	48 Kg Freestyle	Nadi Chamka; Bangladesh (BAN)	6–0 W	S. P. S. Niroshani; Sri Lanka (SRI)	4–0 W	Sumitra; Nepal (NEP)	2–0 W	1st place, gold medalist(s)
Mamata	53 Kg Freestyle	Nasima Akhtar; Bangladesh (BAN)	5–0 W	Ishwarinath; Nepal (NEP)	2–0 W	PPak Wijesinghe; Sri Lanka (SRI)	4–0 W	1st place, gold medalist(s)
Archana Tomar	55 Kg Freestyle	Sarmila Rai; Nepal (NEP)	2–0 W	M. W. M. P. Kumari; Sri Lanka (SRI)	6–0 W	S. Chaowdhary; Bangladesh (BAN)	6–0 W	1st place, gold medalist(s)
Manju Kumari	58 Kg Freestyle	Luximi Kattri; Nepal (NEP)	10–0 W	Tanjina Masudi; Bangladesh (BAN)	4–0 W	WMDDK Weerbahu; Sri Lanka (SRI)	10–0 W	1st place, gold medalist(s)
Manisha	60 Kg Freestyle	M. W. D. M. Priyanka Kumari; Sri Lanka (SRI)	6–0 W	Rina Khatar; Bangladesh (BAN)	6–0 W	X Kabita; Nepal (NEP)	2–0 W	1st place, gold medalist(s)
Shilpi Seron	63 kg Freestyle	Santi Choudhary; Nepal (NEP)	2–0 W	Farzana Shamrin; Bangladesh (BAN)	2–0 W	Ramm Rupa Singh; Sri Lanka (SRI)	4–0 W	1st place, gold medalist(s)
Rajani	69 Kg Freestyle	Shirin Sultana; Bangladesh (BAN)	8–0 W	GG Senevera; Sri Lanka (SRI)	4–0 W	Lila Singh; Nepal (NEP)	4–0 W	1st place, gold medalist(s)
Nikki	75 Kg Freestyle	Min Khutn; Bangladesh (BAN)	4–0 W	Bhanu Thapalia; Nepal (NEP)	4–0 W	WPCKR WeeraSingh; Sri Lanka (SRI)	6–0 W	1st place, gold medalist(s)

== Wushu ==
=== Men ===
Athlete	Event	Points	Rank
Anjul Namdeo	Taolu-Changquan	8.66	3rd place, bronze medalist(s)

Athlete	Event	Points		Total	Rank
Athlete	Event	Nanquan	Nangun	Total	Rank
M. Punshiva Meitei	Taolu- Nanquan & Nangun	9.4	9.2	18.6	1st place, gold medalist(s)

Athletes	Event	Total Points	Rank
Chirag Sharma	Taolu- Daoshu & Gunshu	18.42	1st place, gold medalist(s)

Athletes	Event	Total Points	Rank
M Gyandash Singh	Taolu-Taijiquan & Taijijian	18.53	1st place, gold medalist(s)

Athletes	Event	Opponent	Rank
Uchit Sharma	Sanshou Men's 52Kg		1st place, gold medalist(s)
Ravi panchal	Sanshou Men's 56Kg		1st place, gold medalist(s)
Surya Bhanu Pratap Singh	Sanshou Men's 60Kg		1st place, gold medalist(s)
Arun Nagar	Sanshou Men's 65Kg		3rd place, bronze medalist(s)
Mukesh Choudhary	Sanshou Men's 70Kg		2nd place, silver medalist(s)
Pradeep Kumar	Sanshou Men's 75Kg		3rd place, bronze medalist(s)

=== Women ===
Athlete	Event	Points	Rank
Y Sapana Devi	Taolu-Changquan	9.45	1st place, gold medalist(s)

Athlete	Event	Points		Total	Rank
Athlete	Event	Nanquan	Nandao	Total	Rank
Swechcha Jatav	Taolu- Nanquan & Nando	8.2	8.13	16.33	2nd place, silver medalist(s)

Athletes	Event	Total Points	Rank
L Sanatombi Chanu	Taolu-Taijiquan & Taijijian	18.62	1st place, gold medalist(s)

Athlete	Event	Opponent	Result
Y. Sanathoi Devi	Sanshou Women's 56 Kg		1st place, gold medalist(s)
Anupama Devi	Sanshou Women's 60 Kg		1st place, gold medalist(s)
Puja Kadian	Sanshou Women's 70 Kg		1st place, gold medalist(s)
