= Afghanistan at the 2016 South Asian Games =

- IOC code: AFG
- NOC: Afghanistan National Olympic Committee

in Guwahati and Shillong
- Competitors: 718
- Medals Ranked 4th: Gold 7 Silver 9 Bronze 19 Total 35

South Asian Games appearances (overview)
- 2004; 2006; 2010; 2016

Afghanistan participated in the 2016 South Asian Games in Guwahati and Shillong, Afghanistan from 5 February to 16 February 2016.

== Medal summary ==
=== Medal table ===
Afghanistan won 7 golds and a total of 35 medals.

Sport	Gold	Silver	Bronze	Total
Taekwondo	6	1	1	8
Wushu	1	2	8	11
Judo	0	4	2	6
Boxing	0	1	5	6
Wrestling	0	1	3	4
Archery	0	0	0	0
Athletics	0	0	0	0
Badminton	0	0	0	0
Cycling	0	0	0	0
Field Hockey	0	0	0	0
Football	0	0	0	0
Handball	0	0	0	0
Kabaddi	0	0	0	0
Kho kho	0	0	0	0
Shooting	0	0	0	0
Squash	0	0	0	0
Swimming	0	0	0	0
Table tennis	0	0	0	0
Tennis	0	0	0	0
Triathlon	0	0	0	0
Volleyball	0	0	0	0
Totals (21 entries)	7	9	19	35
