= Lalruatfeli Hnialum =

Indian woman Hockey player

Personal information
- Born: 15 July 1996 (age 30) Mizoram, India

Sport
- Country: India
- Sport: Field hockey
- Position: Defender
National team
Years	Team	Caps	Goals
2016–2017	India	24	(0)
Medal record
Women's Field Hockey
Representing India
Asian Champions Trophy
Gold medal – first place	2016 Singapore
South Asian Games
Gold medal – first place	2016 Guwahati	Team

Lalruatfeli Hnialum (born 15 July 1996) is an Indian women's hockey player. She was a part of India at the 2016 South Asian Games and the reserve member for the team at 2016 Summer Olympics. She is in reserve athletes in case of injury.
