= Nepal at the 2016 South Asian Games =

- IOC code: NEP
- NOC: Nepal Olympic Committee

in Guwahati and Shillong
- Competitors: 398 in 22 sports
- Medals Ranked 6th: Gold 3 Silver 23 Bronze 35 Total 61

South Asian Games appearances (overview)
- 1984; 1985; 1987; 1989; 1991; 1993; 1995; 1999; 2004; 2006; 2010; 2016; 2019; 2025

Nepal participated in the 2016 South Asian Games in Guwahati and Shillong, India from 5 to 16 February 2016. The first gold medal for Nepal was won by Wushu player Nima Gharti Magar. Judo player Fupu Lahmu Khatri earned Nepal's second gold medal in judo. Later, Nepal also won the men's football gold medal.

== Medal summary ==
=== Medal table ===
Nepal won 3 gold and a total of 61 medals.

Sport	Gold	Silver	Bronze	Total
Wushu	1	10	1	12
Judo	1	2	6	9
Football	1	1	0	2
Taekwondo	0	7	3	10
Swimming	0	1	3	4
Weightlifting	0	1	3	4
Triathlon	0	1	1	2
Boxing	0	0	3	3
Badminton	0	0	2	2
Kho-Kho	0	0	2	2
Squash	0	0	2	2
Table tennis	0	0	2	2
Wrestling	0	0	2	2
Archery	0	0	1	1
Athletics	0	0	1	1
Field hockey	0	0	1	1
Kabaddi	0	0	1	1
Volleyball	0	0	1	1
Cycling	0	0	0	0
Handball	0	0	0	0
Shooting	0	0	0	0
Tennis	0	0	0	0
Totals (22 entries)	3	23	35	61
