= Nima Gharti Magar =

Nepalese wushu competitor

Personal information
- Full name: Nirma Gharti Magar
- National team: Nepal
- Education: Nepal Don Bosco School, Siddhipur, Lalitpur
- Years active: 2012–
- Height: 178 cm (5 ft 10 in)

Sport
- Sport: Wushu
- Club: Ninja Wushu Guan
Medal record
Wushu
Representing Nepal
South Asian Games
Gold medal – first place	2016 Guwahati	Taolu - Nanquan
Gold medal – first place	2016 Guwahati	Nanquan & Nandao
- Updated on 13 February 2016

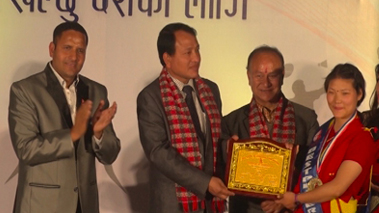

Nirma Gharti Magar is a Wushu competitor and gold medalist at the 2016 South Asian Games.

Nima's gold was the fifth gold medal secured by Nepal from wushu in the history of South Asian Games. Bina Khadka and Rajkumar Rasaili had earned gold medals in wushu in 2006 in Colombo and Binita Maharjan and Angbabu Lama in 2010 in Dhaka.
