= Wrestling at the 2016 South Asian Games =

- Venue: RG Baruah Sports Complex, Guwahati
- Dates: 6–8 February 2016

Wrestling at the 2016 South Asian Games were held in Guwahati, India from 10 to 15 February 2016.

== Medal table ==
Rank	Nation	Gold	Silver	Bronze	Total
1	India (IND)	14	2	0	16
2	Pakistan (PAK)	2	4	1	7
3	Sri Lanka (SRI)	0	5	7	12
4	Bangladesh (BAN)	0	3	7	10
5	Afghanistan (AFG)	0	2	3	5
6	Nepal (NEP)	0	0	2	2
Totals (6 entries)		16	16	20	52

== Medalists ==
=== Men's freestyle ===
Event	Gold	Silver	Bronze
57 kg	Ravinder Singh; India	Muhammad Bilal; Pakistan	S.D. Asanga; Sri Lanka
61 kg	Pradeep Kumar; India	Abdul Wahali; Pakistan	Rambabu Yadav; Nepal
65 kg	Rajneesh; India	Muhammad Nadar; Pakistan	W.M.C. Pareira; Sri Lanka
70 kg	Amit Kumar Dhankar; India	Malak Jan; Afghanistan	T.K.S. Maduranga; Sri Lanka
74 kg	Pardeep; India	Muhammad Asad Butt; Pakistan	B.P. Rathnayaka; Sri Lanka
74 kg	Pardeep; India	Muhammad Asad Butt; Pakistan	Abdul Ghafar; Afghanistan
86 kg	Muhammad Inam; Pakistan	Gopal Yadav; India	Mohammad Rehman; Bangladesh
86 kg	Muhammad Inam; Pakistan	Gopal Yadav; India	Bazhand; Afghanistan
97 kg	Mausam Khatri; India	Rajab Naseri; Afghanistan	Bilal Hosen; Bangladesh
125 kg	Zaman Anwar; Pakistan	Mandeep Singh; India	R. Rasool; Afghanistan

=== Women's freestyle ===
Event	Gold	Silver	Bronze
48 kg	Priyanka Singh; India	S.P.S Niroshini; Sri Lanka	Nadi Chakma; Bangladesh
53 kg	Mamta; India	Anusha Kumari Wijesinghe; Sri Lanka	Nasema Akhtar; Bangladesh
55 kg	Archana Tomar; India	M.W.M.P. Kumari; Sri Lanka	Suma Chowdhury; Bangladesh
58 kg	Manju Kumari; India	Deepika Dilhane Weerabahu; Sri Lanka	Tanjina Masudi; Bangladesh
60 kg	Manisha Bhanwala; India	Rina Akhtar; Bangladesh	Priyanga Kumari; Sri Lanka
63 kg	Shilpi Sheoran; India	Farzana Sharmin; Bangladesh	Ram Rupa Singha; Sri Lanka
69 kg	Rajani; India	Shirin Sultana; Bangladesh	Senevera Thana; Sri Lanka
75 kg	Nikki; India	Ravihari Weerasingha; Sri Lanka	Mina Khatun; Bangladesh
