= Field hockey at the 2016 South Asian Games =

Field Hockey at the 2016 South Asian Games

Field hockey at the 2016 South Asian Games was scheduled to be held in Maulana Md. Tayabullah Hockey Stadium, Guwahati, India from 10 – 15 February 2016.

== Medalists ==
| Event | Gold | Silver | Bronze |
|---|---|---|---|
| Men | Pakistan (PAK) | India (IND) | Bangladesh (BAN) |
| Women | India (IND) | Sri Lanka (SRI) | Nepal (NEP) |

== Medal table ==
* Host nation (India)

| Rank | Nation | Gold | Silver | Bronze | Total |
|---|---|---|---|---|---|
| 1 | India (IND)* | 1 | 1 | 0 | 2 |
| 2 | Pakistan (PAK) | 1 | 0 | 0 | 1 |
| 3 | Sri Lanka (SRI) | 0 | 1 | 0 | 1 |
| 4 | Bangladesh (BAN) | 0 | 0 | 1 | 1 |
| 4 | Nepal (NEP) | 0 | 0 | 1 | 1 |
| Totals (5 entries) | | 2 | 2 | 2 | 6 |

== Draw ==
Due to very few number of participation countries both Men's and Women's event were played in round-robin with a final format. India picked an inexperienced team of training camp players for the men's event.
