= Nitendra Singh Rawat =

Indian marathon runner

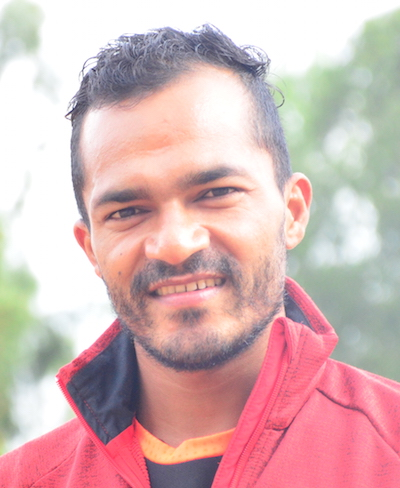

Personal information
- Nickname: Nitin
- Nationality: Indian
- Born: 29 September 1986 (age 39) Garur, Uttarakhand
- Height: 5' 8'' (5 ft 8 in)
- Weight: 58 kg (128 lb)

Sport
- Country: India
- Sport: Marathon
Medal record
South Asian Games
Gold medal – first place	2016 Guwahati	Marathon

Nitendra Singh Rawat (born 29 September 1986) is an Indian marathon runner. He was selected to represent India at the 2016 Summer Olympics in Rio de Janeiro, in the men's marathon along with Gopi T. and Kheta Ram.
