= Sadia Gul =

Pakistani professional squash player (born 1998)

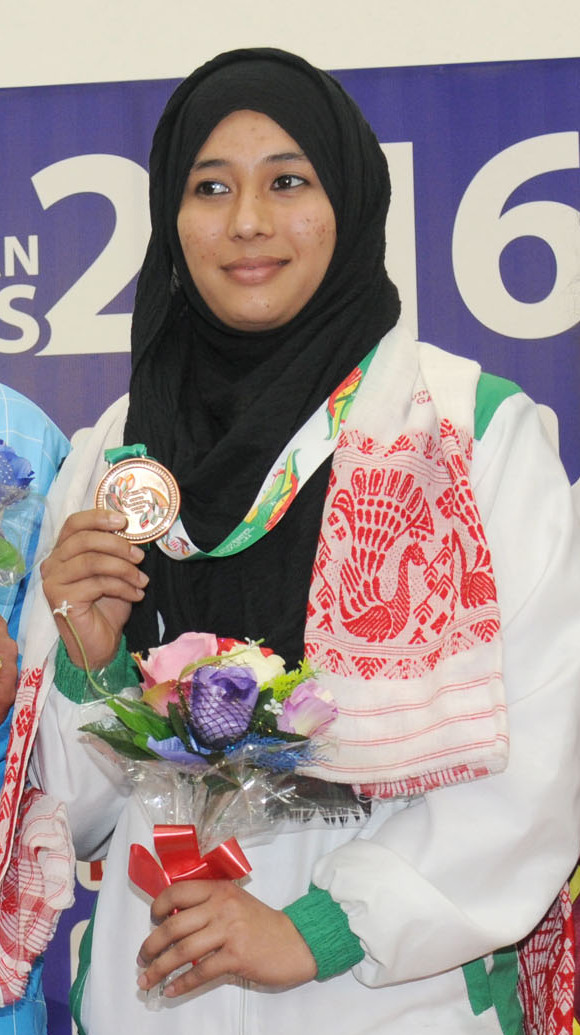

Personal information
- Born: March 4, 1998 (age 28) Bannu, Pakistan

Sport
- Country: Pakistan
- Handedness: Right Handed
- Retired: Active

Women's singles
- Highest ranking: No. 84 (January 2018)
- Current ranking: No. 467 (January 2025)
Medal record
Women's squash
Representing Pakistan
South Asian Games
| Bronze medal – third place | 2016 India | Singles |
- Updated on February, 2018

Sadia Gul (born 4 March 1998) is a Pakistani professional squash player. As of February 2018, she was ranked number 467th in the world.
