= Archery at the 2016 South Asian Games =

Archery at the 2016 South Asian Games were held in Guwahati, India from 5 – 9 February 2016.

== Medalists ==
=== Recurve ===
Event	Gold	Silver	Bronze
Men's individual	(India) Tarundeep Rai	(India) Gurucharan Besra	(Nepal) Prem Prasad Pun
Men's team	(India) India; Tarundeep Rai; Gurucharan Besra; Jayanta Talukdar	(Sri Lanka) Sri Lanka; Nipuna Senevirathne; Indranath; Sajeev de Silva	(Bangladesh) Bangladesh; Sojeb Shiek; Md. Tamumul Ishlam; Md. Emdadl Haque
Women's individual	(India) Deepika Kumari	(India) Bombayla Devi Laishram	(Bhutan) Karma
Women's team	(India) India; Deepika Kumari; Bombayla Devi Laishram; Laxmirani Majhi	(Sri Lanka) Sri Lanka; Dilhara Salgado; Anuradha Karunaratne; Suchini Ubeysiri	(Bhutan) Bhutan; Karma; Sonam Deki; Sonam Dema
Mixed team	(India) India; Deepika Kumari; Tarundeep Rai	(Bangladesh) Bangladesh; Beauty Ray; Sojeb Shiek	(Bhutan) Bhutan; Karma; Jigme Norbu

=== Compound ===
Event	Gold	Silver	Bronze
Men's individual	Rajat Chauhan; India	Abhishek Verma; India	Tshewang Dorji; Bhutan
Men's team	India (IND); Rajat Chauhan; Abhishek Verma; Manash Jyoti Changamai	Bhutan (BHU); Tashi Peljor; Tshewang Dorji; Khendrup	Bangladesh (BAN); Md. Anowerul Kadar; Suman Kumar Das; Ehesan Ahmed
Women's individual	Purvasha Shende; India	Jyothi Surekha Vennam; India	Tammanna Parvin; Bangladesh
Women's team	India (IND); Purvasha Shende; Jyothi Surekha Vennam; Lily Chanu Paonam	Bangladesh (BAN); Susmita Banik; Tammanna Parvin; Roksana Akter	–
Mixed team	India (IND); Purvasha Shende; Abhishek Verma	Bangladesh (BAN); Susmita Banik; Md. Anowerul Kadar	–

== Medal table ==
Rank	Nation	Gold	Silver	Bronze	Total
1	India (IND)	10	4	0	14
2	Bangladesh (BAN)	0	3	3	6
3	Sri Lanka (SRI)	0	2	0	2
4	Bhutan (BHU)	0	1	4	5
5	Nepal (NEP)	0	0	1	1
Totals (5 entries)		10	10	8	28
