= Amit Kumar Dhankar =

Indian sport wrestler (born 1987)

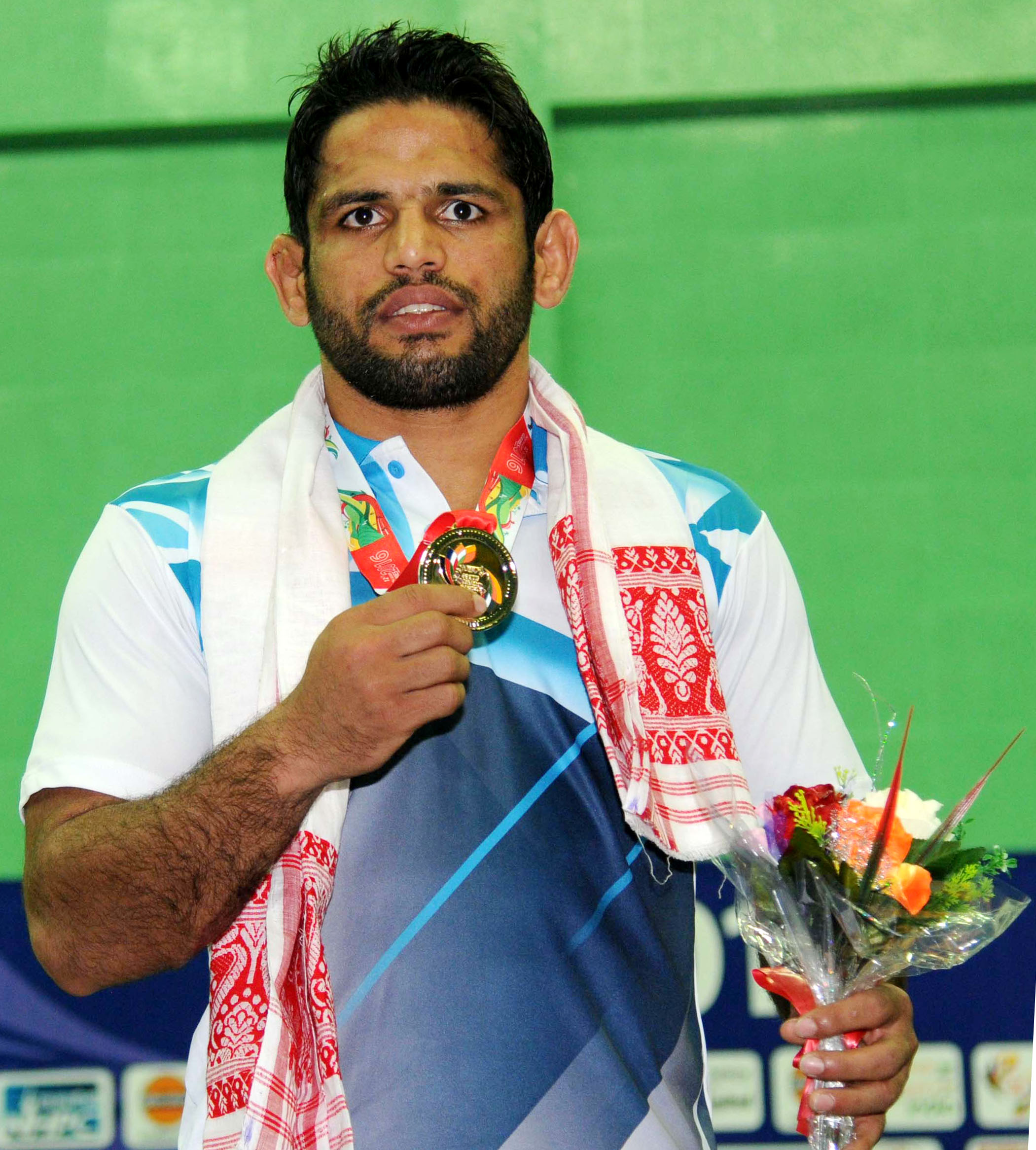
- Dhankhar after winning Gold at the 2016 South Asian Games

Personal information
- Nationality: Indian
- Born: 2 January 1987 (age 39) Humayunpur, Haryana, India

Sport
- Country: India
- Sport: Freestyle wrestling
Medal record
Men's Wrestling
Representing India
Asian Wrestling Championships
Gold medal – first place	2013 New Delhi	66 kg Freestyle
Silver medal – second place	2019 Xi'an	74 kg Freestyle
Commonwealth Wrestling Championship
Silver medal – second place	2007 London	66 kg Freestyle
Silver medal – second place	2007 London	66 kg GR
Bronze medal – third place	2009 Jalandhar	66 kg Freestyle
Gold medal – first place	2011 Melbourne	66 kg Freestyle
Gold medal – first place	2013 Johannesburg	66 kg Freestyle
Gold medal – first place	2016 Singapore	70 kg Freestyle
South Asian Games
Gold medal – first place	2016 Guwahati	70 kg Freestyle

Amit Kumar Dhankar (born 2 January 1987) is a freestyle wrestler from India. He became Asian wrestling champion in 2013, along with becoming Commonwealth wrestling champion twice. He also won gold medal in the 2016 South Asian Games. In 2015, he participated in the inaugural edition of the Pro Wrestling League, where his team won the title. He is employed as an inspector in the Haryana Police.

Owing to the presence of Yogeshwar Dutt in Dhankar's weight category, he could hardly get a chance to represent India in the events like Commonwealth Games, Asian Games, World Wrestling Championships, Olympic Qualifiers, etc. In 2014, Dhankar moved to the Delhi High Court after the Wrestling Federation of India shortlisted Yogeshwar Dutt for the 2014 Commonwealth Games without conducting trials, but to no avail. In 2015, at the trails for the World Wrestling Championships, Yogeshwar Dutt was able to defeat Dhankar to secure his place in the 65 kg category of the Freestyle. In 2016, Yogeshwar again defeated Dhankar in the trials of the Asian Olympic qualifiers.
