= Shivani Kataria =

Indian swimmer (born 1997)

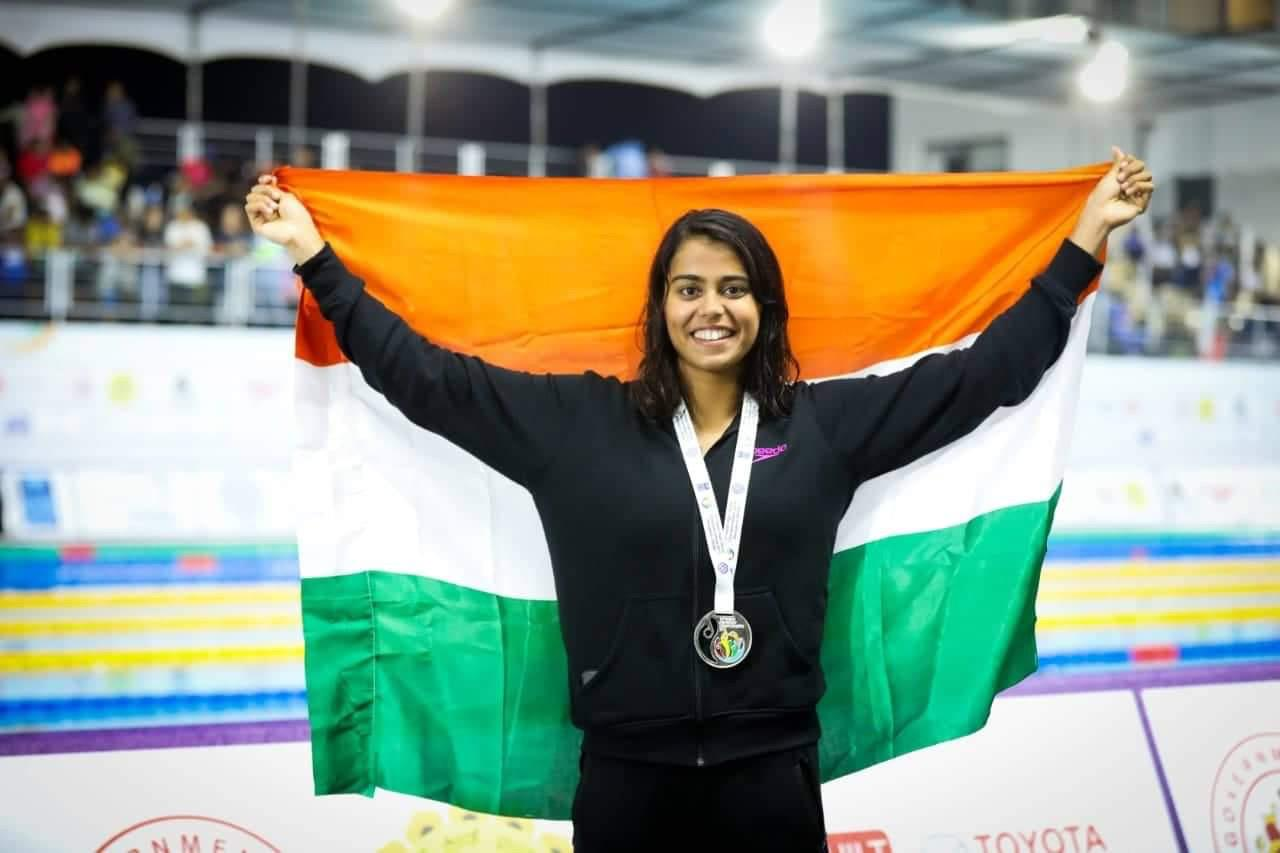

Personal information
- National team: India
- Born: September 27, 1997 (age 29) Gurugram, Haryana, India

Sport
- Sport: Swimming
- Strokes: Freestyle
Medal record
Representing India
South Asian Games
Gold medal – first place	2016 Guwahati	200m freestyle
Gold medal – first place	2016 Guwahati	4x100m freestyle relay
Gold medal – first place	2016 Guwahati	4x200m freestyle relay
Gold medal – first place	2016 Guwahati	4x100m medley relay
Silver medal – second place	2016 Guwahati	400m freestyle
Bronze medal – third place	2016 Guwahati	100m freestyle

Shivani Kataria (born 27 September 1997) is an Indian swimmer. She competes in the women's 200m freestyle. She represented India at 2016 Summer Olympics . She has also won many medals at South Asian Games and Asian Age Group Championship .

== Early life ==
Shivani was born in Haryana, and raised in Gurugram where she attended DAV Public School. She started swimming at 6 at a summer camp at Baba Gang Nath Swimming Centre near her house. Her parents were supportive. She started competing in district level events under her first coach Mr. Yadav and won the bronze medal at CBSE nationals in Gujarat. In 2012, she decided to become a professional swimmer and started swimming two hours in the morning and two in the evening along with an hour of core exercises during the day. She earned her bachelor's degree in history from Hansraj College, Delhi.

== Career ==
Shivani finished sixth in the 200m freestyle at the 2013 Asian Youth Championships and won a gold medal at the 2016 South Asian Games. In 2015, she trained for a year at the FINA camp at Thyanpura in Phuket, Thailand, where she swam three times a day. She clocked 2:04:00 in that camp and was closest to a time slot level, called the B Cut.

=== 2016 Summer Olympics ===
Shivani was selected as India's wildcard entry for the Rio Olympics by the Swimming Federation of India (SFI), making her the first Indian women to swim in the Summer Olympics since 2004 in Athens. She competed at the 2016 Summer Olympics in the women's 200 metre freestyle event; her time of 2:09.30 in the heats did not qualify her for the semifinals. She holds most of India's national records. Shivani sees the 2016 Olympics qualification more as a learning curve which will strengthen her chances in the 2020 Olympic.
