= Judo at the 2016 South Asian Games =

- Dates: 10–15 February 2016

Judo is among the sports which was contested at the 2016 South Asian Games. Judo was hosted in Guhwati, India between 10 and 15 February 2019.

== Medalists and Medal Table ==
=== Men ===
Event	Gold	Silver	Bronze
60 kg	Bhupinder Singh; India	Ali Popalzai; Afghanistan	Mudassir Ali; Pakistan
60 kg	Bhupinder Singh; India	Ali Popalzai; Afghanistan	Indra Bahadur Shrestha; Nepal
66 kg	Jasleen Singh Saini; India	Mohammad Reshad Aryan; Afghanistan	Babar Hussain; Pakistan
66 kg	Jasleen Singh Saini; India	Mohammad Reshad Aryan; Afghanistan	Ramesh Magar; Nepal
73 kg	Manjeet Nandal; India	Darmawardene RCN; Sri Lanka	Imtiaz Hussain; Pakistan
73 kg	Manjeet Nandal; India	Darmawardene RCN; Sri Lanka	Abdul Manan Mkhadom; Afghanistan
81 kg	Karanjit Singh Maan; India	Ajmal Faizzada; Afghanistan	Qaiser Khan; Pakistan
81 kg	Karanjit Singh Maan; India	Ajmal Faizzada; Afghanistan	MD. Habibur Rahman; Bangladesh
90 kg	Avtar Singh; India	Mohd.Ismail Kakar; Afghanistan	Gihan Gwkdd; Sri Lanka
90 kg	Avtar Singh; India	Mohd.Ismail Kakar; Afghanistan	M.Afzal Bashir; Pakistan
100 kg	Shah Hussain Shah; Pakistan	Shubham Kumar; India	Shiva Bahadur Baram; Nepal
100 kg	Shah Hussain Shah; Pakistan	Shubham Kumar; India	M.Tawafiq Bakhshi; Afghanistan

=== Women ===
Event	Gold	Silver	Bronze
48 kg	Shushila Devi Likmabam; India	Humaria Ashiq; Pakistan	Sandamali MP; Sri Lanka
48 kg	Shushila Devi Likmabam; India	Humaria Ashiq; Pakistan	Sarita Chaudhary; Nepal
52 kg	Kalpana Devi Thoudam; India	Lila Adhikari; Nepal	Iran Shahzadi; Pakistan
52 kg	Kalpana Devi Thoudam; India	Lila Adhikari; Nepal	Tahamida Tabass Jerin; Bangladesh
57 kg	Anita Chanu Angom; India	Manita Shrestha Pradhan; Nepal	Shumaila Gull; Pakistan
57 kg	Anita Chanu Angom; India	Manita Shrestha Pradhan; Nepal	Liyanage K.L.M.P.K; Sri Lanka
63 kg	Phupu Lhamu Khatri; Nepal	Sunibala Devi Huidrom; India	Ambreen Masih; Pakistan
63 kg	Phupu Lhamu Khatri; Nepal	Sunibala Devi Huidrom; India	Wijewardene Dyl; Sri Lanka
70 kg	Pooja; India	Beenish Khan; Pakistan	Jayarathne Waprl; Sri Lanka
70 kg	Pooja; India	Beenish Khan; Pakistan	Ganga Chaudhary; Nepal
78 kg	Fouzia Mumtaz; Pakistan	Aruna; India	Jayawardana W.G.L.D; Sri Lanka
78 kg	Fouzia Mumtaz; Pakistan	Aruna; India	Punam Shrestha; Nepal

=== Medals ===
Rank	Nation	Gold	Silver	Bronze	Total
1	India (IND)	9	3	0	12
2	Pakistan (PAK)	2	2	8	12
3	Nepal (NEP)	1	2	6	9
4	Afghanistan (AFG)	0	4	2	6
5	Sri Lanka (SRI)	0	1	6	7
6	Bangladesh (BAN)	0	0	2	2
Totals (6 entries)		12	12	24	48
