= Volleyball at the 2016 South Asian Games =

Volleyball at the 2016 South Asian Games were held in Guwahati, India from 9 to 16 February 2016.

== Medalists ==
| Event | Gold | Silver | Bronze |
|---|---|---|---|
| Men | India | Sri Lanka | Pakistan |
| Women | India | Sri Lanka | Nepal |

== Medal table ==
| Rank | Nation | Gold | Silver | Bronze | Total |
|---|---|---|---|---|---|
| 1 | India (IND) | 2 | 0 | 0 | 2 |
| 2 | Sri Lanka (SRI) | 0 | 2 | 0 | 2 |
| 3 | Nepal (NEP) | 0 | 0 | 1 | 1 |
| 3 | Pakistan (PAK) | 0 | 0 | 1 | 1 |
| Totals (4 entries) | | 2 | 2 | 2 | 6 |

== Draw ==
=== Men ===
Group A

- India (Host)
- Sri Lanka
- Nepal

Group B

- Pakistan
- Bangladesh
- Afghanistan
- Maldives

=== Women ===
Group A

- India (Host)
- Pakistan
- Maldives

Group B

- Sri Lanka
- Afghanistan
- Nepal
