= Wushu at the 2016 South Asian Games =

- Dates: 10–15 February

Wushu at the 2016 South Asian Games were held in Guwahati, India from 10 to 15 February 2016.

In men's Sanshou, India grabbed three gold with Uchit Sharma (52 kg), Ravi Panchal (56 kg), Surya Bhanu Pratap Singh (60 kg) emerging winners in their respective weight categories.

Pakistan's Ali Haider and Maaz Khan won a gold medal defeating Shekib Haidari of Afghanistan and Mukesh Choudhary (Wushu) of India in the 65 kg and 70 kg categories.

In the women's Sanshou event, Y. Sanathoi Devi (52 kg), Anupama Devi (60 kg), Puja Kadian (70 kg) emerged victorious grabbing all gold medals

Pakistan won two gold, two silver and six bronze medals while Nepal secured one gold, 10 silver and a bronze medal.

== Medalists ==
Event	Gold		Silver		Bronze	
Women's Taijiquan & Taijijian	India (IND); L. Sanatombi Chanu	18.62	Nepal (NEP); Sabita Rai	17.70	Pakistan (PAK); Komal Emmanuel	14.16
Men's Taijiquan & Taijijian	India (IND); M. Gyandash Singh	18.53	Nepal (NEP); Hari Prashad Gole	17.62	Bangladesh (BAN); Md. Rahmoutullah Kisor	16.80
Men's Taolu Daoshu & Gunshu	India (IND); Chirag Sharma	18.42	Nepal (NEP); Bishow Budha Magar	17.76	Pakistan (PAK); Md. Waleed Ajmal	15.35
Women's Taolu - Nanquan	Nepal (NEP); Nima Gharti Magar	16.91	India (IND); Swechcha Jatav	16.33	Pakistan (PAK); Mubashra Akhtar	12.70
Men's Taolu - Nanquan	India (IND); M. Punshiva Meitei	18.60	Nepal (NEP); Yubaraj Thapa	17.66	Sri Lanka (SRI); H. M. P. Manuranga	16.51
Women's Nanquan & Nandao	Nepal (NEP); Nima Gharti Magar	16.91	India (IND); Swechcha Jatav	16.33	Pakistan (PAK); Mubashra Akhtar	12.70
Men's Nanquan & Nangun	India (IND); M. Punshiva Meitei	18.60	Nepal (NEP); Yubaraj Thapa	17.66	Sri Lanka (SRI); H. M. P. Manuranga	16.51
Women's Taolu - Changquan	India (IND); Y.Sapna Devi	9.45	Nepal (NEP); Susmita Thapa	8.72	Pakistan (PAK); Nazia Parvez	6.30
Men's Taolu - Changquan	Sri Lanka (SRI); P.L.H. Lakshan	8.86	Nepal (NEP); Bijay Sinjali	8.80	India (IND); Anjul NamdeO	8.66

== Medal table ==
Rank	Nation	Gold	Silver	Bronze	Total
1	India (IND)	0	0	1	1
Totals (1 entries)		0	0	1	1
