= Kabaddi at the 2016 South Asian Games =

== 2016 South Asian Games ==
The 2016 South Asian Games, held from February 5 to February 16 in Guwahati and Shillong, India, saw the active participation of Afghanistan, Bangladesh, Bhutan, India, Maldives, Nepal, Pakistan, and Sri Lanka. These nations engaged in a wide array of sporting events during the competition.

== Kabaddi ==
Kabaddi, which originated in South Asia, is a dynamic game played between two teams on opposite halves of a field. It is also known by various names in different countries such as hu-tu-tu, ha-do-do, chedu-gedu, gudu, and theecub, which involves individual players cross the opponent’s half turn by turn while repeatedly chanting “kabaddi-kabaddi” and scores the points by touching opponents before returning to their territory without getting caught or taking a breath.

Kabaddi at the 2016 South Asian Games were held in Guwahati, India from 10 to 15 February 2016.

== Women's Kabaddi: Gold Medal Winner ==
The Indian Women’s Kabaddi team, led by star player Abhilasha Mhatre, helped the team win the gold medal with a comprehensive victory, scoring 32-12 against Bangladesh.

== Road to Men's Final ==
The Indian men’s kabaddi team displays a remarkable skill and secured a place in the final by defeating Bangladesh with a score of 29-9 whereas Pakistan, with an impressive comeback against Sri Lanka securing a place in Final with the score of 22-11.

== Men's Kabaddi: Gold Medal Winner ==
The men’s team also clinched gold by defeating archrival Pakistan in the tense gold match. Captain Anup Kumar led the team to victory by a narrow margin of two points. The final score of the match was 9-7.

== Medalists ==
Event	Gold	Silver	Bronze
Men's team	India (IND)	Pakistan (PAK)	Bangladesh (BAN)
Men's team	India (IND)	Pakistan (PAK)	Sri Lanka (SRI)
Women's team	India (IND)	Bangladesh (BAN)	Sri Lanka (SRI)
Women's team	India (IND)	Bangladesh (BAN)	Nepal (NEP)

== Medal table ==
Rank	Nation	Gold	Silver	Bronze	Total
1	India (IND)	2	0	0	2
2	Bangladesh (BAN)	0	1	1	2
3	Pakistan (PAK)	0	1	0	1
4	Sri Lanka (SRI)	0	0	2	2
5	Nepal (NEP)	0	0	1	1
Totals (5 entries)		2	2	4	8
