= Squash at the 2016 South Asian Games =

Squash at the 2016 South Asian Games were held in Guwahati, India from 10–15 February 2016.

== Medalists ==
| Event | Gold | Silver | Bronze |
|---|---|---|---|
| Men's singles | (Pakistan) Farhan Zaman | (India) Saurav Ghosal (India) Harinder Pal Sandhu | |
| Women's singles | (India) Joshna Chinappa | (Pakistan) Maria Toorpakay Wazir | (Sri Lanka) Mihiliya Methsarani |
| Women's singles | (India) Joshna Chinappa | (Pakistan) Maria Toorpakay Wazir | (Pakistan) Sadia Gul |
| Men's team | India (IND) | Bangladesh (BAN); Sri Lanka (SRI) | Nepal (NEP) |
| Women's team | India (IND) | Pakistan (PAK) | Sri Lanka (SRI); Nepal (NEP) |

Note : Nasir Iqbal's Gold medal in Men's Single was stripped off following getting banned after failing Doping test. Players behind him got medals. Due to Lack of Participants, Bronze Medal in Men's Single was not awarded.

Nasir Iqbal was in Men's team too. Thus the Silver Medal of Pakistan Men's Squash Team was stripped off and given to the next.

== Medal table ==
| Rank | Nation | Gold | Silver | Bronze | Total |
|---|---|---|---|---|---|
| 1 | India (IND) | 3 | 2 | 0 | 5 |
| 2 | Pakistan (PAK) | 1 | 2 | 1 | 4 |
| 3 | Sri Lanka (SRI) | 0 | 1 | 2 | 3 |
| 4 | Bangladesh (BAN) | 0 | 1 | 0 | 1 |
| 5 | Nepal (NEP) | 0 | 0 | 2 | 2 |
| Totals (5 entries) | | 4 | 6 | 5 | 15 |

== See also ==
- Doping at the 2016 South Asian Games
