= Table tennis at the 2016 South Asian Games =

- Dates: 6–10 February

Table tennis at the 2016 South Asian Games were held in Guwahati, India from 6 – 10 February 2016.

== Medalists ==
Event	Gold	Silver	Bronze
Men's singles	(India) Anthony Amalraj	(India) Sathiyan Gnanasekaran	(Sri Lanka) Rohan Sirisena
Men's singles	(India) Anthony Amalraj	(India) Sathiyan Gnanasekaran	(Sri Lanka) Udaya Ranasinghe
Women's singles	(India) Mouma Das	(India) Manika Batra	(Sri Lanka) Ruvini Kannangara
Women's singles	(India) Mouma Das	(India) Manika Batra	(Sri Lanka) Ishara Madurangi
Men's doubles	India (IND); Sathiyan Gnanasekaran; Devesh Karia	India (IND); Anthony Amalraj; Sanil Shetty	Sri Lanka (SRI); Udaya Ranasinghe; Nirmala Jayasinghe
Men's doubles	India (IND); Sathiyan Gnanasekaran; Devesh Karia	India (IND); Anthony Amalraj; Sanil Shetty	Sri Lanka (SRI); Rohan Sirisena; Chameera Ginige
Women's doubles	India (IND); Pooja Sahasrabudhe; Manika Batra	India (IND); Mouma Das; Shamini Kumaresan	Sri Lanka (SRI); Ishara Madurangi; Erandi Warusawithana
Women's doubles	India (IND); Pooja Sahasrabudhe; Manika Batra	India (IND); Mouma Das; Shamini Kumaresan	Nepal (NEP); Nabita Shrestha; Elina Maharjan
Mixed doubles	India (IND); Anthony Amalraj; Manika Batra	India (IND); Sathiyan Gnanasekaran; Mouma Das	Sri Lanka (SRI); Udaya Ranasinghe; Ruvini Kannangara
Mixed doubles	India (IND); Anthony Amalraj; Manika Batra	India (IND); Sathiyan Gnanasekaran; Mouma Das	Sri Lanka (SRI); Rohan Sirisena; Ishara Madurangi
Men's team	India (IND); Anthony Amalraj; Sathiyan Gnanasekaran; Sanil Shetty	Sri Lanka (SRI); Udaya Ranasinghe; Rohan Sirisena; Nirmala Jayasinghe	Pakistan (PAK); Asim Qureshi; Ali Sajjad Faisal; M Ramees
Men's team	India (IND); Anthony Amalraj; Sathiyan Gnanasekaran; Sanil Shetty	Sri Lanka (SRI); Udaya Ranasinghe; Rohan Sirisena; Nirmala Jayasinghe	Nepal (NEP); Deep Saun; Purushottam Bajracharya; Shiv Sundar Gathe
Women's team	India (IND); Manika Batra; Mouma Das; Shamini Kumaresan	Pakistan (PAK); Rahila Kashif; Ayesha Ansari; Shabnam Bilal	Sri Lanka (SRI); Ruvini Kannangara; Ishara Madurangi; Erandi Warusawithana
Women's team	India (IND); Manika Batra; Mouma Das; Shamini Kumaresan	Pakistan (PAK); Rahila Kashif; Ayesha Ansari; Shabnam Bilal	Bangladesh (BAN); Moumita Alam; Rahima Akhter; Snigaha Sultana

== Medal table ==
Rank	Nation	Gold	Silver	Bronze	Total
1	India (IND)	7	5	0	12
2	Sri Lanka (SRI)	0	1	10	11
3	Pakistan (PAK)	0	1	1	2
4	Nepal (NEP)	0	0	2	2
5	Bangladesh (BAN)	0	0	1	1
Totals (5 entries)		7	7	14	28
