= Cycling at the 2016 South Asian Games =

Aspect of the 2016 South Asian Games

Cycling at the 2016 South Asian Games were held in Guwahati, India from 6 – 9 February 2016.

== Medalists ==
Event	Gold		Silver		Bronze	
40km Individual Time Trial	Arvind Panwar; India (IND)	52:28.800	Manjeet Singh; India (IND)	54:01.183	Janaka Gonagalage; Sri Lanka (SRI)	55:25.441
60km Criterium	Jeevan Pilippenge; Sri Lanka (SRI)	34 points	Naveen Mahappu Arachchige; Sri Lanka (SRI)	24 points	Pankaj Kumar; India (IND)	21 points
70km Team Time Trial	India (IND); Arvind Panwar; Manjeet Singh; Deepak Kumar Rahi; Manohar Lal Bishnoi	1:29:37.840	Pakistan (PAK); Nisar Ahmed; Habib Ullah; Najeeb Ullah; Awais Khan	1:31:31.500	Sri Lanka (SRI); Avishka Dilnuwan Mawathage; Dinunuwan Warnakulasooriya; Janaka Gonagalage; Sree Biswas	1:31:45.420
100km Individual Road Race	Jeevan Silva Pilippenge; Sri Lanka (SRI)	2:25:38.650	Pankaj Kumar; India (IND)	+s.t.	Nisar Ahmed; Pakistan (PAK)	+s.t.

Women

Event	Gold		Silver		Bronze	
30km Individual Time Trial	Bidyaluxmi Torungbam; India (IND)	49:24.573	Chaoba Devi Elangbam; India (IND)	49:31.311	Sahiba Bibi; Pakistan (PAK)	50:10.598
40km Criterium	Lidiyamol Menamparambil; India (IND)	30 points	Manorama Tongbram; India (IND)	26 points	Sudarika Peththaperuma Aarachchige; Sri Lanka (SRI)	9 points
40km Team Time Trial	Bidyaluxmi Tourangbam; Rutuja Satpute; Manisha G Chaoba Devi Elangbam; India (IND)	59:23.52	Udeshani Niranjani Kumarasinghe; Gunathilaka Horathal Pedige; Sriyalatha Udagedera Durayalage; Sudarika Peththaperuma Arachchige; Sri Lanka (SRI)	1:02:07.530	Sabiha Bibi; Rashda Munir; Rajia Shabbir; Fiza Riaz; Pakistan (PAK)	1:02:42.280
80km Individual Road Race	Bidyaluxmi Tourangbam; India (IND)	2:30:55.350	Lidiyamol Sunny Menamparambil; India (IND)	2:30:55.690	Geethu Raj N N India (IND)	2:30:55.900

== Medal table ==
Rank	Nation	Gold	Silver	Bronze	Total
1	India (IND)	6	5	2	13
2	Sri Lanka (SRI)	2	2	3	7
3	Pakistan (PAK)	0	1	3	4
Totals (3 entries)		8	8	8	24
