= List of Bangladeshi records in swimming =

The Bangladeshi records in swimming are the fastest ever performances of swimmers from Bangladesh, which are recognised and ratified by the Bangladesh Swimming Federation.

All records were set in finals unless noted otherwise.

== Long course (50 m) ==
=== Men ===
Event	Time		Name	Club	Date	Meet	Location	Ref
50 m freestyle	23.92	h	Mohammad Mahfizur Rahman	Bangladesh	11 August 2016	Olympic Games	Rio de Janeiro, Brazil	
100 m freestyle	52.34		Mohammad Mahfizur Rahman	Bangladesh	10 February 2016	South Asian Games	Guwahati, India	
200 m freestyle	1:56.19		Mohammad Mahfizur Rahman	Bangladesh	6 February 2016	South Asian Games	Guwahati, India	
400 m freestyle	4:14.69	h	Kajol Mia	Bangladesh	25 July 2026	Commonwealth Games	Glasgow, United Kingdom	
800 m freestyle	9:05.59	†	Mohammad Mahfizur Rahman	Bangladesh	7 February 2016	South Asian Games	Guwahati, India	
1500 m freestyle	17:11.95		Mohammad Mahfizur Rahman	Bangladesh	7 February 2016	South Asian Games	Guwahati, India	
50 m backstroke	26.57	h	Samiul Islam Rafi	Bangladesh	24 July 2026	Commonwealth Games	Glasgow, United Kingdom	
100 m backstroke	58.36	h	Samiul Islam Rafi	Bangladesh	28 July 2025	World Championships	Singapore, Singapore	
200 m backstroke	2:11.08	h	Samiul Islam Rafi	Bangladesh	10 April 2024	Thailand Age Group Championships	Samut Prakan, Thailand	
50 m breaststroke	30.21	sf	Mohamed Ariful Islam	Bangladesh	13 May 2017	Islamic Solidarity Games	Baku, Azerbaijan	
100 m breaststroke	1:06.64		Mohamed Kamal Hossain	Bangladesh	7 February 2016	South Asian Games	Guwahati, India	
200 m breaststroke	2:26.99		Mohamed Shariful Islam	Bangladesh	6 February 2016	South Asian Games	Guwahati, India	
50 m butterfly	25.23	h	Samiul Islam Rafi	Bangladesh	28 July 2026	Commonwealth Games	Glasgow, United Kingdom	
100 m butterfly	56.64		Mohamed Mahamudun Nobi Nahid	Bangladesh	6 February 2016	South Asian Games	Guwahati, India	
200 m butterfly	2:12.52	h	Kajol Mia	Bangladesh	27 July 2026	Commonwealth Games	Glasgow, United Kingdom	
200 m individual medley	2:12.12		Samiul Islam Rafi	Bangladesh	27 April 2025	Malaysian Open	Kuala Lumpur, Malaysia	
400 m individual medley	4:52.50		Mohamed Juwel Ahmed	Bangladesh	8 February 2016	South Asian Games	Guwahati, India	
400 m individual medley	4:51.59	#	Samiul Islam Rafi	Bangladesh	25 April 2025	Malaysian Open	Kuala Lumpur, Malaysia	
4×100m freestyle relay	3:39.72		Rafiqul Islam (58.00); Mohamed Mahfizur (52.99); Mohamed Anik Islam (55.22); Mohamed Ashief Riza (53.51)	Bangladesh	6 February 2016	South Asian Games	Guwahati, India	
4×200m freestyle relay	8:31.08		Mohamed Ashief Riza (2:01.01); Mohamed Anik Islam (2:04.12); Mohamed Juwel Ahmed (2:06.29); Mohamed Mahfizur (2:19.66)	Bangladesh	9 February 2016	South Asian Games	Guwahati, India	
4×100m medley relay	4:01.03		Mohamed Juwel Ahmed (1:03.86); Mohamed Mahfizur (1:07.47); Mohamed Mahamudun (56.86); Mohamed Kamal Hossain (52.84)	Bangladesh	10 February 2016	South Asian Games	Guwahati, India	

Legend: # – Record awaiting ratification by Bangladesh Swimming Federation; WR – World record; AS – Asian record;
Records not set in finals: h – heat; sf – semifinal; r – relay 1st leg; rh – relay heat 1st leg; b – B final; † – en route to final mark; so – swim-off; tt – time trial

=== Women ===
Event	Time		Name	Club	Date	Meet	Location	Ref
50m freestyle	29.78	h	Junayna Ahmed	Bangladesh	30 July 2021	Olympic Games	Tokyo, Japan	
100m freestyle	1:06.16		Miss Najma Khatun	Bangladesh	10 February 2016	South Asian Games	Guwahati, India	
200m freestyle	2:27.14		Miss Najma Khatun	Bangladesh	6 February 2016	South Asian Games	Guwahati, India	
400m freestyle	5:12.78		Miss Najma Khatun	Bangladesh	17 May 2017	Islamic Solidarity Games	Baku, Azerbaijan	
800m freestyle	10:49.98		Miss Najma Khatun	Bangladesh	13 May 2017	Islamic Solidarity Games	Baku, Azerbaijan	
1500 m freestyle								
50m backstroke	32.86	sf	Naima Akter	Bangladesh	16 May 2017	Islamic Solidarity Games	Baku, Azerbaijan	
100m backstroke	1:12.12	sf	Naima Akter	Bangladesh	13 May 2017	Islamic Solidarity Games	Baku, Azerbaijan	
200m backstroke	2:46.93		Naima Akter	Bangladesh	7 February 2016	South Asian Games	Guwahati, India	
50m breaststroke	34.81		Mahfuza Khatun	Bangladesh	13 May 2017	Islamic Solidarity Games	Baku, Azerbaijan	
100m breaststroke	1:17.86		Mahfuza Khatun	Bangladesh	7 February 2016	South Asian Games	Guwahati, India	
200m breaststroke	2:49.60		Romana Akter	Bangladesh	6 February 2016	South Asian Games	Guwahati, India	
50m butterfly	31.67		Papia Khatun	Bangladesh	10 February 2016	South Asian Games	Guwahati, India	
100m butterfly	1:09.88		Sonia Aktar	Bangladesh	6 February 2016	South Asian Games	Guwahati, India	
200m butterfly	2:34.95	h	Junayna Ahmed	Bangladesh	24 July 2019	World Championships	Gwangju, South Korea	
200m individual medley	2:42.73		Romana Akter	Bangladesh	10 February 2016	South Asian Games	Guwahati, India	
400m individual medley	5:59.28		Romana Akter	Bangladesh	7 February 2016	South Asian Games	Guwahati, India	
4×100 m freestyle relay								
4×200m freestyle relay	10:02.03		Mst Sabura Khatun (2:31.15); Most Sharmin Sultana (2:30.69); Romana Akter (2:32.52); Miss Najma Khatun (2:27.67)	Bangladesh	9 February 2016	South Asian Games	Guwahati, India	
4×100m medley relay	4:50.36		Naima Akter (1:14.45); Mahfuza Khatun (1:18.45); Sonia Aktar (1:11.09); Najma Khatun (1:06.37)	Bangladesh	10 February 2016	South Asian Games	Guwahati, India	

Legend: # – Record awaiting ratification by Bangladesh Swimming Federation; WR – World record; AS – Asian record;
Records not set in finals: h – heat; sf – semifinal; r – relay 1st leg; rh – relay heat 1st leg; b – B final; † – en route to final mark; so – swim-off; tt – time trial

== Short course (25 m) ==
=== Men ===
Event	Time		Name	Club	Date	Meet	Location	Ref
50m freestyle	23.04		Mohammad Asif Reza	Bangladesh	6 December 2019	South Asian Games	Kathmandu, Nepal	
100m freestyle	51.25		Mohammad Mahfizur Rahman	Bangladesh	9 December 2019	South Asian Games	Kathmandu, Nepal	
200m freestyle	1:54.22		Mohammad Mahfizur Rahman	Bangladesh	5 December 2019	South Asian Games	Kathmandu, Nepal	
400m freestyle	4:12.24		Faisal Ahamed	Bangladesh	8 December 2019	South Asian Games	Kathmandu, Nepal	
800m freestyle								
1500m freestyle	17:00.33		Faisal Ahamed	Bangladesh	6 December 2019	South Asian Games	Kathmandu, Nepal	
50m backstroke	24.33		Samiul Islam Rafi	Bangladesh	15 August 2026	Thailand Age Group Championships	Bangkok, Thailand	
100m backstroke	54.37	h	Samiul Islam Rafi	Bangladesh	10 December 2024	World Championships	Budapest, Hungary	
200m backstroke	2:14.70	h	Juwel Ahmmed	Bangladesh	6 December 2019	South Asian Games	Kathmandu, Nepal	
50m breaststroke	28.36		Mohammed Ariful Islam	Bangladesh	7 December 2019	South Asian Games	Kathmandu, Nepal	
100m breaststroke	1:02.95		Mohammed Ariful Islam	Bangladesh	6 December 2019	South Asian Games	Kathmandu, Nepal	
200m breaststroke	2:23.02		Mohammed Ariful Islam	Bangladesh	5 December 2019	South Asian Games	Kathmandu, Nepal	
50m butterfly	24.43		Samiul Islam Rafi	Bangladesh	15 August 2026	Thailand Age Group Championships	Bangkok, Thailand	
100m butterfly	55.25		Mohammad Mahamudun Nahid	Bangladesh	5 December 2019	South Asian Games	Kathmandu, Nepal	
200m butterfly	2:09.98		Juwel Ahmmed	Bangladesh	8 December 2019	South Asian Games	Kathmandu, Nepal	
100m individual medley								
200m individual medley	2:12.47		Mohammed Ariful Islam	Bangladesh	9 December 2019	South Asian Games	Kathmandu, Nepal	
400m individual medley	4:40.82		Juwel Ahmmed	Bangladesh	7 December 2019	South Asian Games	Kathmandu, Nepal	
4×50m freestyle relay								
4×100m freestyle relay	3:30.72		Mohammad Asif Reza; Mohammed Ariful Islam; Mohammad Mahamudun Nahid; Mohammad Rahman	Bangladesh	5 December 2019	South Asian Games	Kathmandu, Nepal	
4×200m freestyle relay	7:55.25			Bangladesh	8 December 2019	South Asian Games	Kathmandu, Nepal	
4×50m medley relay								
4×100m medley relay	3:53.75		Juwel Ahmmed; Mohammed Ariful Islam; Mohammad Mahamudun Nahid; Mohammad Asif Reza	Bangladesh	9 December 2019	South Asian Games	Kathmandu, Nepal	

Legend: # – Record awaiting ratification by Bangladesh Swimming Federation; WR – World record; AS – Asian record;
Records not set in finals: h – heat; sf – semifinal; r – relay 1st leg; rh – relay heat 1st leg; b – B final; † – en route to final mark; so – swim-off; tt – time trial

=== Women ===
Event	Time		Name	Club	Date	Meet	Location	Ref
50 m freestyle	30.21	h	Sonia Aktar	Bangladesh	15 December 2018	World Championships	Hangzhou, China	
100 m freestyle	1:04.24	h	Sonia Aktar	Bangladesh	9 December 2019	South Asian Games	Kathmandu, Nepal	
200 m freestyle								
400 m freestyle	5:27.81		Mst Mukti Khatun	Bangladesh	8 December 2019	South Asian Games	Kathmandu, Nepal	
800 m freestyle	9:35.15		Junayna Ahmed	Bangladesh	7 December 2019	South Asian Games	Kathmandu, Nepal	
1500 m freestyle								
50 m backstroke	31.94	h	Juthi Akter	Bangladesh	12 December 2024	World Championships	Budapest, Hungary	
100 m backstroke	1:11.25	h	Juthi Akter	Bangladesh	10 December 2024	World Championships	Budapest, Hungary	
200 m backstroke	2:38.76		Shuraya Chumki	Bangladesh	6 December 2019	South Asian Games	Kathmandu, Nepal	
50 m breaststroke	35.30	h	Mahfuza Khatun	Bangladesh	6 December 2016	World Championships	Windsor, Canada	
100 m breaststroke	1:18.76	h	Mahfuza Khatun	Bangladesh	9 December 2016	World Championships	Windsor, Canada	
200 m breaststroke	2:49.08		Romana Akter	Bangladesh	5 December 2019	South Asian Games	Kathmandu, Nepal	
50 m butterfly	31.34	h	Sonia Aktar	Bangladesh	9 December 2019	South Asian Games	Kathmandu, Nepal	
100 m butterfly								
200m butterfly	2:33.75		Junayna Ahmed	Bangladesh	8 December 2019	South Asian Games	Kathmandu, Nepal	
100 m individual medley								
200m individual medley	2:42.50	h	Sonia Khatun	Bangladesh	9 December 2019	South Asian Games	Kathmandu, Nepal	
400m individual medley	5:25.23		Junayna Ahmed	Bangladesh	6 December 2019	South Asian Games	Kathmandu, Nepal	
4×50 m freestyle relay								
4×100m freestyle relay	4:24.37		Summa Akter; Sonia Aktar; Sonia Khatun; Junayna Ahmed	Bangladesh	5 December 2019	South Asian Games	Kathmandu, Nepal	
4×200m freestyle relay	10:00.13			Bangladesh	8 December 2019	South Asian Games	Kathmandu, Nepal	
4×50 m medley relay								
4×100m medley relay	5:44.18		Shuraya Chumki; Romana Akter; Sonia Khatun; Junayna Ahmed	Bangladesh	9 December 2019	South Asian Games	Kathmandu, Nepal	

Legend: # – Record awaiting ratification by Bangladesh Swimming Federation; WR – World record; AS – Asian record;
Records not set in finals: h – heat; sf – semifinal; r – relay 1st leg; rh – relay heat 1st leg; b – B final; † – en route to final mark; so – swim-off; tt – time trial
