= List of Sri Lankan records in swimming =

The Sri Lankans records in swimming are the fastest ever performances of swimmers from Sri Lanka, which are recognised and ratified by the Sri Lanka Aquatic Sports Union.

All records were set in finals unless noted otherwise.

== Long Course (50 m) ==
=== Men ===
| Event | Time | | Name | Club | Date | Meet | Location | Ref |
|---|---|---|---|---|---|---|---|---|
| 50 m freestyle | 22.65 | h | Matthew Abeysinghe | Sri Lanka | 9 April 2018 | Commonwealth Games | Gold Coast, Australia | |
| 100 m freestyle | 49.11 | h | Matthew Abeysinghe | Sri Lanka | 7 April 2018 | Commonwealth Games | Gold Coast, Australia | |
| 200 m freestyle | 1:50.97 | h | Matthew Abeysinghe | Sri Lanka | 19 August 2018 | Asian Games | Jakarta, Indonesia | |
| 400 m freestyle | 4:03.90 | | Matthew Abeysinghe | Killer Whale Aquatics | 25 September 2014 | Sri Lankan Championships | Colombo, Sri Lanka | |
| 800 m freestyle | 8:45.06 | | Dilanka Bandisaththamge | Azura Florida Aquatics | 23 May 2026 | Terrapin Invite | Boca Raton, United States | |
| 1500 m freestyle | 16:23.61 | | Matthew Abeysinghe | Killer Whale Aquatics | 14 July 2012 | National Age Group Championships | Colombo, Sri Lanka | |
| 50 m backstroke | 25.86 | h | Akalanka Peiris | Sri Lanka | 17 February 2024 | World Championships | Doha, Qatar | |
| 100 m backstroke | 56.99 | | Akalanka Peiris | Sri Lanka | 11 September 2017 | Asian Age Group Championships | Tashkent, Uzbekistan | |
| 200 m backstroke | 2:05.49 | h | Andrew Abeysinghe | Dayton Raiders | 4 August 2008 | US Junior Championships | Minneapolis, United States | |
| 50m breaststroke | 29.03 | | M.F Muhammad | Killer Whale Aquatics | 8 May 2026 | Selection Trial | Colombo, Sri Lanka | |
| 100m breaststroke | 1:04.04 | h | Kiran Jasinghe | Sri Lanka | 13 June 2023 | Australian Trials | Melbourne, Australia | |
| 200m breaststroke | 2:21.91 | | M.F Muhammad | Killer Whale Aquatics | 9 May 2026 | Selection Trial | Colombo, Sri Lanka | |
| 50m butterfly | 24.58 | h | Matthew Abeysinghe | Sri Lanka | 28 September 2023 | Asian Games | Hangzhou, China | |
| 100m butterfly | 54.33 | | Matthew Abeysinghe | Sri Lanka | 3 July 2016 | Div.1 Age Group Championships | Hong Kong, Hong Kong | |
| 200m butterfly | 2:05.10 | | Cherantha de Silva | - | 11 March 2017 | - | Kuala Lumpur, Malaysia | |
| 200m individual medley | 2:07.15 | | Matthew Abeysinghe | Sri Lanka | 20 October 2016 | South Asian Championships | Colombo, Sri Lanka | |
| 400m individual medley | 4:36.12 | b | Matthew Abeysinghe | Dayton Raiders | 28 March 2008 | - | Indianapolis, United States | |
| 4×100m freestyle relay | 3:22.84 | h | Mathew Abeysinghe (49.51); Akalanka Peiris (51.75); Cherantha de Silva (51.00); Kyle Abeysinghe (50.58) | Sri Lanka | 6 April 2018 | Commonwealth Games | Gold Coast, Australia | |
| 4×200m freestyle relay | 7:53.46 | | Kavindra Nugawela; Dilanka Shehan; Kaveen Weerasinghe; Kyle Abeysinghe | Sri Lanka | 22 October 2016 | South Asian Championships | Colombo, Sri Lanka | |
| 4×100m medley relay | 3:58.11 | | Matthew Abeysinghe (1:03.00); Kiran Jasinghe (1:06.10); Cherantha de Silva (57.45); Kyle Abeysinghe (51.56) | Sri Lanka | 10 February 2016 | South Asian Games | Guwahati, India | |

Legend: # – Record awaiting ratification by Sri Lanka Aquatic Sports Union; WR – World record; AS – Asian record;
Records not set in finals: h – heat; sf – semifinal; r – relay 1st leg; rh – relay heat 1st leg; b – B final; † – en route to final mark; so – swim-off; tt – time trial

=== Women ===
| Event | Time | | Name | Club | Date | Meet | Location | Ref |
|---|---|---|---|---|---|---|---|---|
| 50m freestyle | 26.49 | | Kimiko Raheem | Sri Lanka | 8 February 2016 | South Asian Games | Guwahati, India | |
| 100m freestyle | 57.20 | | Kimiko Raheem | Sri Lanka | 10 February 2016 | South Asian Games | Guwahati, India | |
| 200m freestyle | 2:07.83 | | Kimiko Raheem | Sri Lanka | 21 October 2016 | South Asian Championships | Colombo, Sri Lanka | |
| 400m freestyle | 4:34.34 | | Minagi Rupesinghe | Killer Whale Aquatics | 6 August 2025 | Sri Lankan Championships | Colombo, Sri Lanka | |
| 800m freestyle | 9:37.56 | | Minagi Rupesinghe | Sri Lanka | 5 September 2023 | World Junior Championships | Netanya, Israel | |
| 1500m freestyle | 18:38.07 | | Minagi Rupesinghe | Sri Lanka | 8 September 2023 | World Junior Championships | Netanya, Israel | |
| 50m backstroke | 29.50 | | Kimiko Raheem | Sri Lanka | 1 April 2016 | Thailand Age Group Championships | Samut Prakan, Thailand | |
| 100m backstroke | 1:02.63 | | Kimiko Raheem | Sri Lanka | 2 July 2016 | Div.1 Age Group Championships | Hong Kong, Hong Kong | |
| 200m backstroke | 2:16.97 | | Kimiko Raheem | Sri Lanka | 2 July 2016 | Div.1 Age Group Championships | Hong Kong, Hong Kong | |
| 50m breaststroke | 33.65 | | Ramudi Samarakoon | Killer Whale Aquatics | 6 August 2025 | Sri Lankan Championships | Colombo, Sri Lanka | |
| 100m breaststroke | 1:13.53 | | Ramudi Samarakoon | Killer Whale Aquatics | 7 August 2025 | Sri Lankan Championships | Colombo, Sri Lanka | |
| 200m breaststroke | 2:39.92 | | Ramudi Samarakoon | Killer Whale Aquatics | 9 August 2025 | Sri Lankan Championships | Colombo, Sri Lanka | |
| 50m butterfly | 29.10 | b | Aniqah Gaffoor | Sri Lanka | 23 March 2019 | Singapore Age Group Championships | Singapore, Singapore | |
| 100m butterfly | 1:04.58 | | Aniqah Gaffoor | Sri Lanka | 22 March 2019 | Singapore Age Group Championships | Singapore, Singapore | |
| 200m butterfly | 2:30.91 | | Machiko Raheem | - | 2 November 2014 | - | | |
| 200m individual medley | 2:26.31 | | Hiruki De Silva | Killer Whale Aquatics | 17 May 2025 | Selection Trial | Colombo, Sri Lanka | |
| 400m individual medley | 5:14.58 | | Minagi Rupesinghe | Killer Whale Aquatics | 7 August 2025 | Sri Lankan Championships | Colombo, Sri Lanka | |
| 4×100m freestyle relay | 4:04.45 | | Kimiko Raheem; Vinoli Kaluarachchi; Naveesha Karunanayake; Shehanthi Gunawardana | Sri Lanka | 21 October 2016 | South Asian Championships | Colombo, Sri Lanka | |
| 4×200m freestyle relay | 8:58.63 | | Kimiko Raheem; Vinoli Kaluarachchi; Naveesha Karunanayake; Shehanthi Gunawardana | Sri Lanka | 22 October 2016 | South Asian Championships | Colombo, Sri Lanka | |
| 4×100m medley relay | 4:35.36 | | Kimiko Raheem; Melani Fernando; Hiruni Perera; Vinoli Kaluarachchi | Sri Lanka | 19 October 2016 | South Asian Championships | Colombo, Sri Lanka | |

Legend: # – Record awaiting ratification by Sri Lanka Aquatic Sports Union; WR – World record; AS – Asian record;
Records not set in finals: h – heat; sf – semifinal; r – relay 1st leg; rh – relay heat 1st leg; b – B final; † – en route to final mark; so – swim-off; tt – time trial

=== Mixed relay ===
| Event | Time | | Name | Club | Date | Meet | Location | Ref |
|---|---|---|---|---|---|---|---|---|
| 4×100 m freestyle relay | 3:52.52 | h | | Sri Lanka | 21 July 2017 | Commonwealth Youth Games | Nassau, Bahamas | |
| 4×100 m medley relay | 4:30.90 | | Akalanka Peiris (59.54); Diluk Tennakoon Mudiyansalage (1:13.88); Shenali Herath (1:12.76); Dilrukshi Perera (1:04.72) | Sri Lanka | 8 September 2017 | Asian Age Group Championships | Tashkent, Uzbekistan | |

Legend: # – Record awaiting ratification by Sri Lanka Aquatic Sports Union; WR – World record; AS – Asian record;
Records not set in finals: h – heat; so – swim-off

== Short Course (25 m) ==
=== Men ===
| Event | Time | | Name | Club | Date | Meet | Location | Ref |
|---|---|---|---|---|---|---|---|---|
| 50 m freestyle | 22.16 | | Matthew Abeysinghe | Sri Lanka | 6 December 2019 | South Asian Games | Kathmandu, Nepal | |
| 100 m freestyle | 49.27 | | Matthew Abeysinghe | Sri Lanka | 9 December 2019 | South Asian Games | Kathmandu, Nepal | |
| 200 m freestyle | 1:48.92 | | Matthew Abeysinghe | Sri Lanka | 5 December 2019 | South Asian Games | Kathmandu, Nepal | |
| 400 m freestyle | 3:56.69 | | Matthew Abeysinghe | - | 2011 | - | | |
| 800 m freestyle | 8:35.24 | | Dilanka Shehan | Sri Lanka Army | 27 December 2022 | Sri Lankan Championships | Colombo, Sri Lanka | |
| 1500 m freestyle | 16:36.94 | | Matthew Abeysinghe | - | 2012 | - | | |
| 50m backstroke | 24.52 | | Akalanka Peiris | Sri Lanka | 28 September 2024 | Australian Championships | Adelaide, Australia | |
| 100m backstroke | 53.47 | h | Akalanka Peiris | Sri Lanka | 26 September 2024 | Australian Championships | Adelaide, Australia | |
| 200m backstroke | 2:01.55 | | Akalanka Peiris | Sri Lanka | 6 December 2019 | South Asian Games | Kathmandu, Nepal | |
| 50m breaststroke | 27.92 | | M.F Muhammad | Zahira College | 11 December 2025 | Sri Lankan Championships | Colombo, Sri Lanka | |
| 100m breaststroke | 1:00.81 | b | Kiran Jasinghe | Sri Lanka | 24 August 2022 | Australian Championships | Sydney, Australia | |
| 200m breaststroke | 2:16.04 | | M.F Muhammad | Zahira College | 14 December 2025 | Sri Lankan Championships | Colombo, Sri Lanka | |
| 50m butterfly | 23.48 | | Cherantha De Silva | Sri Lanka | 1 December 2017 | Singaporean Championships | Singapore, Singapore | |
| 100m butterfly | 52.19 | | Cherantha De Silva | Sri Lanka | 2 December 2017 | Singaporean Championships | Singapore, Singapore | |
| 200m butterfly | 1:57.99 | | Cherantha De Silva | Sri Lanka | 1 December 2017 | Singaporean Championships | Singapore, Singapore | |
| 100m individual medley | 55.79 | | M.F Muhammad | Zahira College | 15 December 2025 | Sri Lankan Championships | Colombo, Sri Lanka | |
| 200m individual medley | 2:01.66 | | Matthew Abeysinghe | Sri Lanka | 9 December 2019 | South Asian Games | Kathmandu, Nepal | |
| 400m individual medley | 4:38.03 | | Heshan Unamboowe | - | 2012 | - | | |
| 4×50m freestyle relay | | | | | | | | |
| 4×100m freestyle relay | 3:19.07 | | Akalanka Peiris; Matthew Abeysinghe; Stephan Perera; Kavindra Nugawela | Sri Lanka | 5 December 2019 | South Asian Games | Kathmandu, Nepal | |
| 4×200m freestyle relay | 7:42.48 | | Stephan Perera; Dilanka Shehan; Kavindra Nugawela; Matthew Abeysinghe | Sri Lanka | 8 December 2019 | South Asian Games | Kathmandu, Nepal | |
| 4×50m medley relay | | | | | | | | |
| 4×100m medley relay | | | | | | | | |

Legend: # – Record awaiting ratification by Sri Lanka Aquatic Sports Union; WR – World record; AS – Asian record;
Records not set in finals: h – heat; sf – semifinal; r – relay 1st leg; rh – relay heat 1st leg; b – B final; † – en route to final mark; so – swim-off; tt – time trial

=== Women ===
| Event | Time | | Name | Club | Date | Meet | Location | Ref |
|---|---|---|---|---|---|---|---|---|
| 50 m freestyle | 26.13 | h | Machiko Raheem | Sri Lanka | 6 December 2014 | World Championships | Doha, Qatar | |
| 100 m freestyle | 56.31 | | Kimiko Raheem | - | 2017 | - | | |
| 200 m freestyle | 2:02.88 | h | Machiko Raheem | Sri Lanka | 7 December 2014 | World Championships | Doha, Qatar | |
| 400 m freestyle | 4:20.23 | | Kimiko Raheem | - | 2017 | - | | |
| 800 m freestyle | 9:19.84 | | Minagi Rupasinghe | Killer Whale Aquatics | 14 December 2025 | Sri Lankan Championships | Colombo, Sri Lanka | |
| 1500 m freestyle | 18:14.73 | | Minagi Rupasinghe | Killer Whale Aquatics | 6 December 2024 | Sri Lankan Championships | Colombo, Sri Lanka | |
| 50 m backstroke | 28.89 | h | Kimiko Raheem | Sri Lanka | 9 December 2016 | World Championships | Windsor, Canada | |
| 100 m backstroke | 1:02.70 | h | Kimiko Raheem | Sri Lanka | 6 December 2016 | World Championships | Windsor, Canada | |
| 200 m backstroke | 2:14.91 | h | Kimiko Raheem | Sri Lanka | 8 December 2016 | World Championships | Windsor, Canada | |
| 50m breaststroke | 33.28 | | Ramudi Samarakoon | Killer Whale Aquatics | 27 December 2022 | Sri Lankan Championships | Colombo, Sri Lanka | |
| 100m breaststroke | 1:12.15 | h | Ramudi Samarakoon | Stipendium Hungaricum | 5 November 2025 | Hungarian Championships | Debrecen, Hungary | |
| 200m breaststroke | 2:36.91 | b | Ramudi Samarakoon | Stipendium Hungaricum | 7 November 2025 | Hungarian Championships | Debrecen, Hungary | |
| 50m butterfly | 28.49 | | Jessie Seneviratne | Unattached | 14 December 2025 | Sri Lankan Championships | Colombo, Sri Lanka | |
| 100m butterfly | 1:03.54 | h | Machiko Raheem | Sri Lanka | 6 December 2014 | World Championships | Doha, Qatar | |
| 200m butterfly | 2:35.61 | h | Miniruwani Samarakoon | Sri Lanka | 9 April 2008 | World Championships | Manchester, Great Britain | |
| 100m individual medley | 1:05.82 | | Hiruki De Silva | Killer Whale Aquatics | 15 December 2025 | Sri Lankan Championships | Colombo, Sri Lanka | |
| 200m individual medley | 2:21.97 | | Kimiko Raheem | - | 2017 | - | | |
| 400m individual medley | 5:03.80 | | Minagi Rupasinghe | Killer Whale Aquatics | 12 December 2025 | Sri Lankan Championships | Colombo, Sri Lanka | |
| 4×50 m freestyle relay | | | | | | | | |
| 4×100m freestyle relay | 4:00.18 | | Bhakthi Karunasena; Sandu Muhandiramge; Ganga Senevirathene; Hiruki De Silva | Sri Lanka | 5 December 2019 | South Asian Games | Kathmandu, Nepal | |
| 4×200m freestyle relay | 8:54.91 | | Sandu Savindi Jayaweera; Ganga Seneviratna; Ramudi Samarakoon; Bhakthi Karunasena | Sri Lanka | 8 December 2019 | South Asian Games | Kathmandu, Nepal | |
| 4×50 m medley relay | | | | | | | | |
| 4×100 m medley relay | 4:24.66 | | Ganga Malwaththage; Ramudi Samarakoon; Aniqah Gaffoor; Bhakthi Karunasena | Sri Lanka | 9 December 2019 | South Asian Games | Kathmandu, Nepal | |

Legend: # – Record awaiting ratification by Sri Lanka Aquatic Sports Union; WR – World record; AS – Asian record;
Records not set in finals: h – heat; sf – semifinal; r – relay 1st leg; rh – relay heat 1st leg; b – B final; † – en route to final mark; so – swim-off; tt – time trial

=== Mixed relay ===
| Event | Time | | Name | Club | Date | Meet | Location | Ref |
|---|---|---|---|---|---|---|---|---|
| 4×50 m freestyle relay | | | | | | | | |
| 4×50 m medley relay | 1:52.58 | h | Kimiko Raheem (30.35); Kiran Jasinghe (30.16); Charantha De Silva K. T. (25.43); Machiko Raheem (26.64) | Sri Lanka | 4 December 2014 | World Championships | Doha, Qatar | |

Legend: # – Record awaiting ratification by Sri Lanka Aquatic Sports Union;
Records not set in finals: h – heat; so – swim-off
