= 2016 FINA World Swimming Championships (25 m) – Women's 200 metre backstroke =

Women's 200 metre backstroke at the 2016 FINA World Swimming Championships (25 m)
- Venue: WFCU Centre
- Dates: 8 December (heats and final)
- Competitors: 42 from 35 nations
- Winning time: 2:00.79

Medalists
gold medal	Katinka Hosszú	Hungary
silver medal	Daryna Zevina	Ukraine
bronze medal	Emily Seebohm	Australia

The Women's 200 metre backstroke competition of the 2016 FINA World Swimming Championships (25 m) was held on 8 December 2016.

== Records ==
Prior to the competition, the existing world and championship records were as follows.

	Name	Nation	Time	Location	Date
World record Championship record	Katinka Hosszú	Hungary	1:59.23	Doha	5 December 2014

== Results ==
=== Heats ===
The heats were held at 11:08.

Rank	Heat	Lane	Name	Nationality	Time	Notes
1	5	4	Daryna Zevina	Ukraine	2:02.87	Q
2	4	4	Katinka Hosszú	Hungary	2:03.39	Q
3	3	3	Hilary Caldwell	Canada	2:03.74	Q
4	3	8	Hellen Moffitt	United States	2:03.83	Q
5	5	5	Emily Seebohm	Australia	2:03.91	Q
6	4	5	Sayaka Akase	Japan	2:04.63	Q
7	5	6	Miki Takahashi	Japan	2:04.76	Q
8	4	6	Kathleen Dawson	Great Britain	2:05.12	Q
9	4	1	Kennedy Goss	Canada	2:05.41	
10	3	4	Daria Ustinova	Russia	2:05.73	
11	4	3	Minna Atherton	Australia	2:05.74	
12	5	3	Simona Baumrtová	Czech Republic	2:06.25	
13	3	7	Chen Jie	China	2:06.38	
14	5	7	Clara Smiddy	United States	2:06.60	
15	5	2	Andrea Berrino	Argentina	2:07.06	
16	3	2	Liu Yaxin	China	2:07.19	
17	3	5	Eygló Gústafsdóttir	Iceland	2:07.36	
18	3	0	Kira Toussaint	Netherlands	2:07.67	
19	5	1	Matea Samardžić	Croatia	2:07.70	NR
20	5	0	Ugnė Mažutaitytė	Lithuania	2:07.79	NR
21	3	6	Sarah Bro	Denmark	2:09.11	
22	5	8	Barbora Závadová	Czech Republic	2:09.21	
23	4	2	Mariella Venter	South Africa	2:09.55	
24	4	7	Martina van Berkel	Switzerland	2:09.67	
25	5	9	Tatiana Salcutan	Moldova	2:09.77	
26	3	1	Hanna Rosvall	Sweden	2:11.55	
27	4	0	Wong Toto Kwan To	Hong Kong	2:11.93	
28	4	8	Florencia Perotti	Argentina	2:13.11	
29	3	9	Kimiko Raheem	Sri Lanka	2:14.91	NR
30	2	5	Lauren Hew	Cayman Islands	2:16.59	NR
31	4	9	Alexus Laird	Seychelles	2:17.71	NR
32	2	3	Celina Marquez	El Salvador	2:18.89	NR
33	1	3	Rosalee Mira Santa Ana	Philippines	2:21.33	
34	2	2	Danielle Titus	Barbados	2:22.76	
35	2	6	Maria Arrua	Paraguay	2:23.71	NR
36	2	7	Britheny Joassaint	Haiti	2:26.10	
37	2	4	Maana Patel	India	2:26.11	NR
38	2	0	Rahaf Baqleh	Jordan	2:30.44	
39	2	8	Tiareth Cijntje	Curaçao	2:31.46	NR
40	2	1	Gabby Gittens	Antigua and Barbuda	2:33.89	NR
41	2	9	Osisang Chilton	Palau	2:39.50	NR
42	1	5	Ruthie Long	Marshall Islands	2:42.62	NR
	1	4	Kaya Forson	Ghana		DNS

=== Final ===
The final was held at 18:53.

Rank	Lane	Name	Nationality	Time	Notes
1st place, gold medalist(s)	5	Katinka Hosszú	Hungary	2:00.79	
2nd place, silver medalist(s)	4	Daryna Zevina	Ukraine	2:02.24	
3rd place, bronze medalist(s)	2	Emily Seebohm	Australia	2:02.65	
4	3	Hilary Caldwell	Canada	2:03.98	
5	8	Kathleen Dawson	United Kingdom	2:04.09	
6	6	Hellen Moffitt	United States	2:04.56	
7	7	Sayaka Akase	Japan	2:05.02	
8	1	Miki Takahashi	Japan	2:06.29	
