= List of Indian records in swimming =

The India Records in Swimming are the fastest times ever swim by a swimmer representing India. These records are maintained by Swimming Federation of India (SFI).

SFI keeps records for both for men and women. Records are kept in the following events (by stroke):

- freestyle: 50, 100, 200, 400, 800 and 1500.
- backstroke: 50, 100 and 200.
- breaststroke: 50, 100 and 200.
- butterfly: 50, 100 and 200.
- individual medley: 100 (25m only), 200 and 400.
- relays: 4x100 free, 4x200 free and 4 × 100 medley.

All records were set in finals unless noted otherwise.

== Long course (50 m) ==
=== Men ===
Event	Time		Name	Club	Date	Meet	Location	Ref
50 m freestyle	22.43	h	Virdhawal Khade	India	21 August 2018	Asian Games	Jakarta, Indonesia	
100 m freestyle	49.46	h	Srihari Nataraj	India	20 July 2025	World University Games	Berlin, Germany	
200 m freestyle	1:48.11	sf	Srihari Nataraj	India	18 July 2025	World University Games	Berlin, Germany	
400 m freestyle	3:52.55		Aryan Nehra	Gujarat	2 July 2023	Indian Championships	Hyderabad, India	
800 m freestyle	7:59.36		Aryan Nehra	Gujarat	20 June 2026	Indian Championships	Ahmedabad, India	
1500 m freestyle	15:14.88		Aryan Nehra	Gujarat	18 June 2026	Indian Championships	Ahmedabad, India	
50 m backstroke	25.18		Srihari Nataraj	India	20 June 2021	Belgrade Trophy	Belgrade, Serbia	
100 m backstroke	53.77	tt	Srihari Nataraj	India	27 June 2021	Sette Colli Trophy	Rome, Italy	
200 m backstroke	1:58.77		Rishabh Das	India	25 September 2026	Asian Games	Tokyo, Japan	
50 m breaststroke	27.59		Sandeep Sejwal	India	23 June 2018	Singapore Championships	Singapore, Singapore	
100 m breaststroke	1:00.97		Sandeep Sejwal	India	11 August 2009	Asian Age Group Championships	Tokyo, Japan	
200 m breaststroke	2:12.02		Sandeep Sejwal	India	12 August 2009	Asian Age Group Championships	Tokyo, Japan	
50 m butterfly	23.63		Benedicton Rohit Beniston	Tamilnadu	20 June 2026	Indian Championships	Ahmedabad, India	
100 m butterfly	52.57		Benedicton Rohit Beniston	Tamil Nadu	22 June 2025	Indian Championships	Bhubaneswar, India	
200 m butterfly	1:56.38		Sajan Prakash	India	26 June 2021	Sette Colli Trophy	Rome, Italy	
200 m individual medley	2:04.13		Vinayak Vijayshankar	SSCB	16 June 2026	Indian Championships	Ahmedabad, India	
400 m individual medley	4:24.64		Shoan Ganguly	Karnataka	26 June 2025	Indian Championships	Bhubaneswar, India	
4 × 100 m freestyle relay	3:21.22	h	Tanish Mathew (50.88); Vishal Grewal (50.97); Shylaja Anilkumar (50.37); Srihari Nataraj (49.00)	India	27 September 2023	Asian Games	Hangzhou, China	
4 × 200 m freestyle relay	7:23.38		Aneesh Gowda (1:53.16); Sajan Prakash (1:50.53); Shoan Ganguly (1:51.40); Srihari Nataraj (1:48.29)	India	29 September 2025	Asian Championships	Ahmedabad, India	
4 × 100 m medley relay	3:40.20		Srihari Nataraj (55.07); Likith Prema (1:01.49); Sajan Prakash (53.16); Tanish Mathew (50.51)	India	26 September 2023	Asian Games	Hangzhou, China	

Legend: # – Record awaiting ratification by SFI; WR – World record; AS – Asian record; e – equalled existing record;
Records not set in finals: h – heat; sf – semifinal; r – relay 1st leg; rh – relay heat 1st leg; b – B final; † – en route to final mark; so – swim-off; tt – time trial

=== Women ===
Event	Time		Name	Club	Date	Meet	Location	Ref
50 m freestyle	26.04		Charita Phanindranath	Karnataka	19 August 2026	Indian Junior Championships	Bhubaneswar, India	
100 m freestyle	56.27		Dhinidhi Desinghu	India	2 November 2026	Youth Olympic Games	Dakar, Senegal	
200 m freestyle	2:01.81		Dhinidhi Desinghu	India	18 July 2026	Asian Age Group Championships	Samutprakan, Thailand	
400 m freestyle	4:21.56		Dhinidhi Desinghu	India	17 July 2026	Asian Age Group Championships	Samutprakan, Thailand	
800 m freestyle	9:05.47		Vritti Agarwal	Telangana	21 June 2026	Indian Championships	Ahmedabad, India	
1500 m freestyle	17:20.82		Aditi Hegde	Maharashtra	16 June 2026	Indian Championships	Ahmedabad, India	
50 m backstroke	29.30		Maana Patel	India	2 October 2015	Asian Age Group Championships	Bangkok, Thailand	
100 m backstroke	1:03.36		Tanishi Gupta	Karnataka	18 August 2026	Indian Junior Championships	Bhubaneswar, India	
200 m backstroke	2:18.59		Palak Joshi	Maharashtra	30 January 2024	Khelo India Youth Games	Chennai, India	
50 m breaststroke	32.94	h	Chahat Arora	Punjab	6 September 2022	Indian Championships	Guwahati, India	
100 m breaststroke	1:12.67		Lineysha A K	Karnataka	5 July 2023	Indian Championships	Hyderabad, India	
200 m breaststroke	2:35.93		Saanvi Deshwal	India	18 July 2026	Asian Age Group Championships	Samutprakan, Thailand	
50 m butterfly	27.41		Tanishi Gupta	Karnataka	18 August 2026	Indian Junior Championships	Bhubaneswar, India	
100 m butterfly	1:00.07		Tanishi Gupta	Karnataka	19 June 2026	Indian Championships	Ahmedabad, India	
200 m butterfly	2:17.09		Astha Chaudhury	Inspire Institute of Sport	17 March 2026	Singapore Age Group Championships	Singapore, Singapore	
200 m individual medley	2:18.06		Saanvi Deshwal	Maharashtra	20 August 2026	Indian Junior Championships	Bhubaneswar, India	
400 m individual medley	4:56.78		Thanya Shadakshari	Karnataka	19 June 2026	Indian Championships	Ahmedabad, India	
4 × 100 m freestyle relay	3:53.45		Nina Venkatesh (59.55); Rujula Shashidhara (57.98); Tanishi Gupta (58.41); Dhinidhi Desinghu (57.51)	Karnataka	16 June 2026	Indian Championships	Ahmedabad, India	
4 × 200 m freestyle relay	8:35.78		Aditi Satish Hegde (2:07.57); Dakshajaa Dey Upreti (2:11.51); Tisya Sonar (2:09.98); Dhinidhi Desinghu (2:06.72)	India	20 July 2026	Asian Age Group Championships	Samutprakan, Thailand	
4 × 100 m medley relay	4:16.85		Jiya Yadav (1:06.83); Saanvi Deshwal (1:12.13); Tanishi Gupta (1:01.06); Dhinidhi Desinghu (56.83)	India	19 July 2026	Asian Age Group Championships	Samutprakan, Thailand	

Legend: # – Record awaiting ratification by SFI; WR – World record; AS – Asian record; e – equalled existing record;
Records not set in finals: h – heat; sf – semifinal; r – relay 1st leg; rh – relay heat 1st leg; b – B final; † – en route to final mark; so – swim-off; tt – time trial

=== Mixed relay ===
Event	Time	Name	Club	Date	Meet	Location	Ref
4 × 50 m freestyle relay	1:40.00	Neel Roy (23.46); Sadhvi Dhuri (27.55); Kenisha Gupta (26.84); Virdhawal Khade (22.15)	SFI	21 September 2018	Indian Championships	Pirappancode, India	
4 × 100 m freestyle relay	3:37.68	Akash Mani; Aneesh Gowda; Nina Venkatesh; Tanishi Gupta	Karnataka	17 June 2026	Indian Championships	Ahmedabad, India	
4 × 50 m medley relay	1:53.42	Maana Patel; Anshul Kothari; Smit Sharma; Dilpreet Kaur	Gujarat	26 September 2016	National Championships	Ranchi, India	
4 × 100 m medley relay	4:01.10	Samarth Gowda Bangalore Suresh (59.55); Nitheesh Murugesh Suji (1:05.24); Tanishi Gupta (1:00.02); Dhinidhi Desinghu (56.29)	India	21 July 2026	Asian Age Group Championships	Samutprakan, Thailand	

Legend: # – Record awaiting ratification by SFI; WR – World record; AS – Asian record; e – equalled existing record;
Records not set in finals: h – heat; so – swim-off

== Short course (25 m) ==
=== Men ===
Event	Time		Name	Club	Date	Meet	Location	Ref
50 m freestyle	21.80		Tanish George Mathew	Kerala	28 October 2026	Indian Championships	Ahmedabad, India	
100 m freestyle	48.21		Tanish George Mathew	Kerala	27 October 2026	Indian Championships	Ahmedabad, India	
200 m freestyle	1:46.61	h	Sajan Prakash	India	17 December 2021	World Championships	Abu Dhabi, United Arab Emirates	
400 m freestyle	3:48.39		Sajan Prakash	Police	28 October 2026	Indian Championships	Ahmedabad, India	
800 m freestyle	7:58.39	h, †	Kushagra Rawat	India	20 December 2021	World Championships	Abu Dhabi, United Arab Emirates	
1500 m freestyle	15:01.44	h	Aryan Makhija	India	15 December 2018	World Championships	Hangzhou, China	
50 m backstroke	24.02		Rishabh Das	Mahasrashtra	26 October 2026	Indian Championships	Ahmedabad, India	
100 m backstroke	51.63		Rishabh Das	Mahasrashtra	25 October 2026	Indian Championships	Ahmedabad, India	
200 m backstroke	1:52.37		Rishabh Das	Mahasrashtra	28 October 2026	Indian Championships	Ahmedabad, India	
50 m breaststroke	27.68	h	Likith Selvaraj Prema	India	4 November 2022	World Cup	Indianapolis, United States	
100 m breaststroke	59.84	h	Likith Selvaraj Prema	India	3 November 2022	World Cup	Indianapolis, United States	
200 m breaststroke	2:13.09		Surya Jhoyappa O R	Karnataka	25 October 2026	Indian Championships	Ahmedabad, India	
50m butterfly	23.19		Sajan Prakash	Police	26 October 2026	Indian Championships	Ahmedabad, India	
100 m butterfly	51.31		Sajan Prakash	Police	25 October 2026	Indian Championships	Ahmedabad, India	
200 m butterfly	1:52.10	h	Sajan Prakash	India	16 December 2021	World Championships	Abu Dhabi, United Arab Emirates	
100 m individual medley	54.50	h	Sajan Prakash	India	8 October 2026	World Cup	Tashkent, Uzbekistan	
200 m individual medley	1:59.80	h	Siva Sridhar	India	13 December 2022	World Championships	Melbourne, Australia	
400 m individual medley	4:24.76		Advait Page	Madhya Pradesh	26 October 2026	Indian Championships	Ahmedabad, India	
4 × 50 m freestyle relay								
4 × 100 m freestyle relay	3:20.50		Srihari Nataraj; Viraj Prabhu; Anand Shylaja; Virdhawal Khade	India	5 December 2019	South Asian Games	Kathmandu, Nepal	
4 × 200 m freestyle relay	7:27.29			India	8 December 2019	South Asian Games	Kathmandu, Nepal	
4 × 50 m medley relay								
4 × 100 m medley relay	3:37.07		Srihari Nataraj; Likith Selvaraj Prema; Mihir Ambre; Virdhawal Khade	India	9 December 2019	South Asian Games	Kathmandu, Nepal	

Legend: # – Record awaiting ratification by SFI; WR – World record; AS – Asian record; e – equalled existing record;
Records not set in finals: h – heat; sf – semifinal; r – relay 1st leg; rh – relay heat 1st leg; b – B final; † – en route to final mark; so – swim-off; tt – time trial

=== Women ===
Event	Time		Name	Club	Date	Meet	Location	Ref
50m freestyle	25.56	h	Charita Phanindranath	Karnataka	28 October 2026	Indian Championships	Ahmedabad, India	
100m freestyle	56.98		Charita Phanindranath	Karnataka	27 October 2026	Indian Championships	Ahmedabad, India	
200m freestyle	2:03.12		Jahnabi Kashyap	Assam	25 October 2026	Indian Championships	Ahmedabad, India	
400m freestyle	4:23.55		Vritti Agarwal	Telangana	28 October 2026	Indian Championships	Ahmedabad, India	
800m freestyle	9:08.20		Vritti Agarwal	Telangana	27 October 2026	Indian Championships	Ahmedabad, India	
1500m freestyle	17:13.84		Vritti Agarwal	Telangana	25 October 2026	Indian Championships	Ahmedabad, India	
50m backstroke	28.94		Maana Patel	India	8 December 2019	South Asian Games	Kathmandu, Nepal	
100m backstroke	1:02.21		Pratyasa Ray	Odisha	25 October 2026	Indian Championships	Ahmedabad, India	
200m backstroke	2:16.20		Pratyasa Ray	Odisha	28 October 2026	Indian Championships	Ahmedabad, India	
50m breaststroke	32.91	h, =	Chahat Arora	India	17 December 2022	World Championships	Melbourne, Australia	
50m breaststroke	32.91	=	Rithvika Mittapalli	India	27 October 2026	Indian Championships	Ahmedabad, India	
100m breaststroke	1:12.18		S Lakshya	Karnataka	26 October 2026	Indian Championships	Ahmedabad, India	
200m breaststroke	2:37.24		Samaira Mehrotra	Maharashtra	25 October 2026	Indian Championships	Ahmedabad, India	
50m butterfly	27.35		Charita Phanindranath	Karnataka	26 October 2026	Indian Championships	Ahmedabad, India	
100m butterfly	1:02.15		Jahnabi Kashyap	Assam	25 October 2026	Indian Championships	Ahmedabad, India	
200m butterfly	2:15.86		Vritti Agarwal	Telangana	27 October 2026	Indian Championships	Ahmedabad, India	
100m individual medley	1:07.20		Vasupalli Naga Greeshmini	Andhra Pradesh	27 October 2026	Indian Championships	Ahmedabad, India	
200m individual medley	2:21.45		Tvisha Nikhil Dixit	Maharashtra	28 October 2026	Indian Championships	Ahmedabad, India	
400m individual medley	4:59.27		Tvisha Nikhil Dixit	Maharashtra	26 October 2026	Indian Championships	Ahmedabad, India	
4 × 50 m freestyle relay	1:50.02	h	Aditi Dhumatkar (26.40); Anusha Mehta Sanjeev Mehta (27.96); Thalasha Satish Prabhu (27.63); Malavika Vishwanath (28.03)	India	7 December 2014	World Championships	Doha, Qatar	
4 × 100 m freestyle relay	3:55:17		Annie Jain; Maana Patel; Divya Satija; Shivangi Sarma	India	5 December 2019	South Asian Games	Kathmandu, Nepal	
4 × 200 m freestyle relay	8:39.61	h	Malavika Vishwanath (2:06.69); Aditi Dhumatkar (2:08.83); Thalasha Satish Prabhu (2:12.32); Anusha Mehta Sanjeev Mehta (2:11.77)	India	3 December 2014	World Championships	Doha, Qatar	
4 × 50 m medley relay	2:00.01		Jyotsna Pansare (30.04); Chahat Arora (33.64); Damini Krishnappa Gowda (29.21); Kataria Shivani (57.83)	India	22 September 2017	Asian Indoor and Martial Arts Games	Ashgabat, Turkmenistan	
4 × 100 m medley relay	4:21.28		Maana Patel; Chahat Arora; Divya Satija; Shivangi Sarma	India	9 December 2019	South Asian Games	Kathmandu, Nepal	

Legend: # – Record awaiting ratification by SFI; WR – World record; AS – Asian record; e – equalled existing record;
Records not set in finals: h – heat; sf – semifinal; r – relay 1st leg; rh – relay heat 1st leg; b – B final; † – en route to final mark; so – swim-off; tt – time trial
