= Syed Nazrul Islam National Swimming Complex =

National water sports venue in Dhaka, Bangladesh

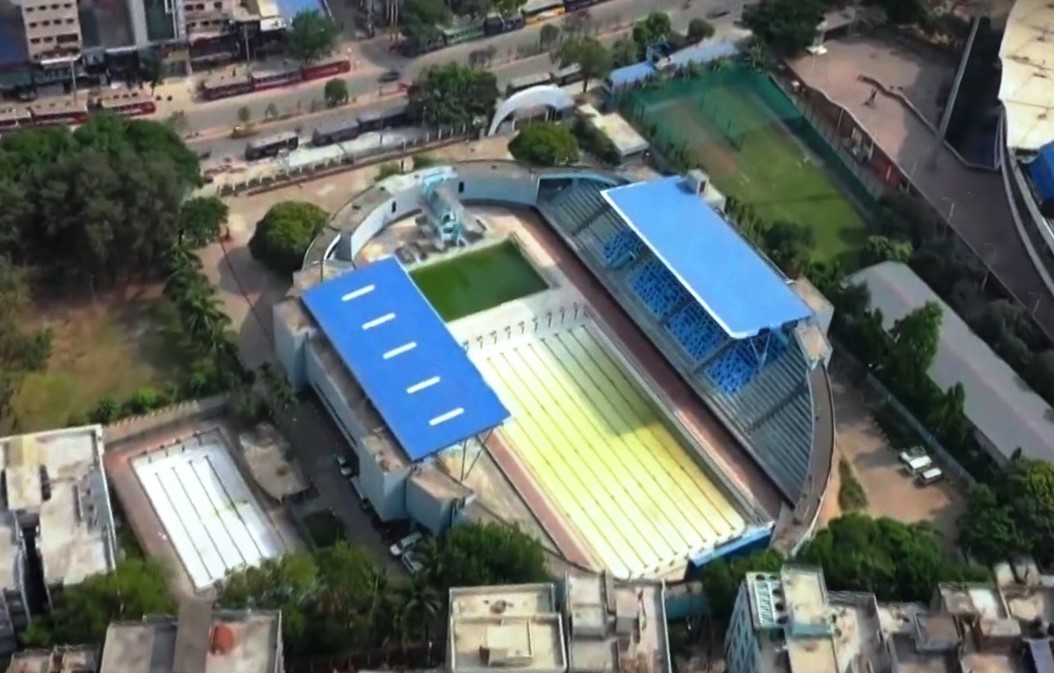
- Bird's eye view of venue.
- Interactive map of Syed Nazrul Islam National Swimming Complex
- Location: National Swimming Complex, Mirpur -2, Dhaka - 1216
- Coordinates: 23.807120°N 90.365397°E
- Owner: National Sports Council
- Operator: Bangladesh Swimming Federation

Construction
- Opened: 1993
- Construction cost: ৳ 12.58 Crore (2019)

Syed Nazrul Islam National Swimming Complex built in 1993, is the national and international swimming sports hosting and training venue of Bangladesh. It is the main swimming venue in Bangladesh and the third venue within Dhaka city, It is affiliated to the National Sports Council, like the official venues for all swimming sports events in Bangladesh. Bangladesh Swimming Federation maintains the pool. The pool is posthumously named after Syed Nazrul Islam. Due to its location, the facility is known as Mirpur Swimming Complex.

== History ==
The complex was constructed in Mirpur on the occasion of the 6th South Asian Games, In 1993. Initial renovations were done on the occasion of the 2010 South Asian Games. In 2017, the National Sports Council started the second phase of renovation and development of the complex at a cost of Bangladeshi Taka 12.58 crore, which lasted till 27 June 2019. During this time LED scoreboard installed, swimmers accommodation were extended from 4th to 6th floor, VVIP box added, underwater waterproof camera, new diving board and canopies have been installed over galleries on both sides of pool.

== Structure ==
The complex's competitive 8-lane swimming pool is an open-air reservoir. There is a separate pool for diving. There is also a 6-storey housing for swimmers and a canopied viewing gallery on either side of the pool. A training pool is kept alongside the main pool.

== Events ==
The venue hosted all the swimming and diving events of the 1993 and 2010 South Asian Games. Apart from the international events, the Bangladesh Games, Bangladesh's national age-level swimming, diving and water polo competitions are also held here. In addition, training programs are held at the complex. Among the public swimming pools in Dhaka city, this one, other than Brojen Das Swimming pool are the most used for learning to swim.
