= Ariful Islam =

Ariful Islam, Md. Ariful Islam or Mohammed Ariful Islam may refer to:

- Mohammed Ariful Islam (footballer)
- Mohammed Ariful Islam (swimmer)
- Ariful Islam, cricketer who plays for the Bangladesh national under-19 cricket team
- Ariful Islam Jony, Bangladeshi cricketer
