= Srihari Nataraj =

Indian swimmer (born 2001)

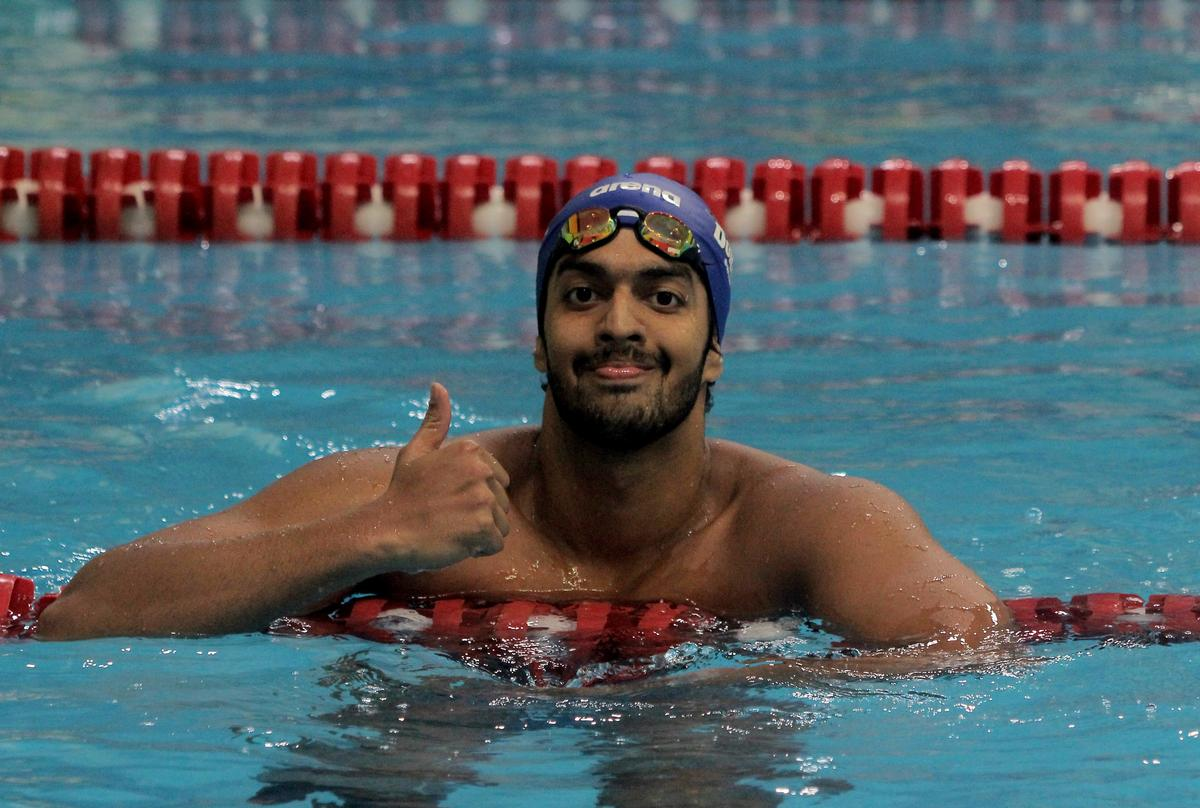
- Nataraj in 2022

Personal information
- Born: 16 January 2001 (age 25) Bengaluru, Karnataka, India
- Height: 1.9 m (6 ft 3 in)
- Weight: 82 kg (181 lb)

Sport
- Sport: Swimming
- Strokes: Freestyle, Backstroke, Medley
- Club: Dolphin Aquatics
- Coach: Nihar Ameen
Medal record
Men's swimming
Representing India
Asian Championships
Silver medal – second place	2025 Ahmedabad	50 m backstroke
Silver medal – second place	2025 Ahmedabad	200 m freestyle
Silver medal – second place	2025 Ahmedabad	4x200 m freestyle
Bronze medal – third place	2025 Ahmedabad	4x100 m freestyle
Bronze medal – third place	2025 Ahmedabad	4x100 m medley
Bronze medal – third place	2025 Ahmedabad	100 m freestyle
Bronze medal – third place	2025 Ahmedabad	100 m backstroke
South Asian Games
Gold medal – first place	2019 Kathmandu	50 m backstroke
Gold medal – first place	2019 Kathmandu	100 m backstroke
Gold medal – first place	2019 Kathmandu	200 m backstroke
Gold medal – first place	2019 Kathmandu	4x100 m medley
Silver medal – second place	2019 Kathmandu	4×100 m freestyle
Silver medal – second place	2019 Kathmandu	100 m freestyle

Srihari Nataraj (born 16 January 2001) is an Indian swimmer. A two time Olympian, he has represented India at the 2020 Tokyo Olympics and 2024 Paris Olympics. As of 2025, he holds 14 Indian national swimming records across different events.

== Career ==
2025: Continuing his domestic dominance, Srihari competed at the 38th National Games held in Uttarakhand. He concluded the event with an exceptional tally of 9 gold medals and 1 silver, winning across a mix of individual and relay events. He was once again named the Best Male Athlete of the Games, cementing his legacy as India's most successful male swimmer of the decade.

2024: Srihari represented India at the 2024 Paris Olympics, competing in the men's 100 m backstroke. He clocked 55.01 seconds in the heats, finishing 33rd overall, and did not qualify for the semifinals. It was his second consecutive Olympic appearance, placing him among a rare group of Indian swimmers with multiple Games participations.

2023: At the 37th National Games in Goa, Srihari dominated the pool with 10 medals — 8 golds (including all three backstroke distances and relays), 1 silver, and 1 bronze. His outstanding performance earned him the title of Best Male Athlete.

Internationally, he competed at the Asian Games in Hangzhou, finishing 6th in the final of the 100 m backstroke (54.48 seconds) and helping the Indian relay team secure 7th place in the men's medley relay.

2022: Srihari had a strong showing at the Commonwealth Games in Birmingham, reaching the finals in multiple events where he stood, 5th place in the 50 m backstroke final (25.23 seconds), 7th place in the 100 m backstroke final (54.55 seconds), 9th overall in the 200 m backstroke (2:00.84), setting a new Indian national record.

2021: Srihari delivered dominant performances at the Senior National Aquatic Championships in Bengaluru, winning gold in the 50 m, 100 m, and 200 m backstroke, along with 100 m and 200 m freestyle. He was also part of victorious teams in the mixed 4×50 m freestyle and men's 4 × 200 m freestyle relays, setting multiple meet records. In the same year, he competed at the 2020 Tokyo Olympics. Representing India in the 100 m backstroke, he clocked 54.31 seconds in the heats, finishing 27th overall, and did not advance to the semifinals. Despite that, he became only the second Indian swimmer to qualify with an Olympic 'A' cut.

2020: Amid the COVID-19 pandemic, Srihari stayed competitive, winning gold medals in the 50 m and 100 m backstroke at the Uzbekistan Open Aquatic Championships in Tashkent. These victories played a vital role in supporting his Olympic qualification campaign for Tokyo.

2019: At the Khelo India Youth Games in Pune, Srihari secured six gold medals — three individual backstroke events (50 m, 100 m, 200 m) and three in relays. At the 73rd Senior National Aquatic Championships in Bhopal, he won gold in the 100 m and 200 m backstroke.

Internationally, at the 2019 South Asian Games in Kathmandu, Srihari won four gold medals — in the 100 m and 200 m backstroke, and in two relay events. He also secured two silver medals in the 50 m backstroke and a freestyle relay. He also competed at the 2019 World Aquatics Championships in Gwangju, South Korea. He finished 40th in the 100 m backstroke heats and 36th in the 200 m backstroke, gaining valuable experience against the world's best.

2018: Srihari competed at the Commonwealth Games in Gold Coast, representing India in the 50 m, 100 m, and 200 m backstroke. Though he did not advance to the finals, it marked his debut at a senior multi-sport international event. He also participated at the Asian Games in Jakarta, participating in the 50 m, 100 m, and 200 m backstroke. He set a personal best of 56.19 seconds in the 100 m backstroke, finishing 8th in the heats. Although he did not make the final, his performance earned attention. Later that year, he represented India at the Youth Olympic Games in Buenos Aires, further sharpening his skills on the international stage.

2017: At the National Junior Aquatic Championships in Pune, Srihari swept his events, winning gold in the 50 m, 100 m, and 200 m backstroke, along with the 200 m freestyle. Internationally, he competed in the Asian Indoor and Martial Arts Games in Ashgabat, Turkmenistan, participating in short-course swimming disciplines and gaining key experience.

2016: Srihari made a sensational international debut at the South Asian Aquatic Championships in Colombo. He won gold in the 100 m and 200 m backstroke, and in the 4 × 100 m medley relay. He also bagged a silver medal in the 50 m backstroke, establishing himself as a rising talent in Indian swimming at just 15 years of age.
