= Swimming at the 2019 South Asian Games =

- Venue: International Sports Complex, Satdobato
- Dates: 5–9 December 2019

Swimming is among the sports which is being contested at the 2019 South Asian Games. Swimming is being hosted in the International Sports Complex, Satdobato between December 5 and 9, 2019.

== Medal table ==
* Host nation (Nepal)

Rank	Nation	Gold	Silver	Bronze	Total
1	India (IND)	27	19	6	52
2	Sri Lanka (SRI)	7	11	18	36
3	Nepal (NEP)*	4	4	4	12
4	Bangladesh (BAN)	0	3	9	12
5	Pakistan (PAK)	0	1	1	2
Totals (5 entries)		38	38	38	114

== Medalists ==
=== Men's events ===
Event	Gold		Silver		Bronze	
50 m freestyle	Matthew Abeysinghe; Sri Lanka	22.16 NR	Virdhawal Khade; India	22.22 NR	Akalanka Peiris; Sri Lanka	22.94
100 m freestyle	Matthew Abeysinghe; Sri Lanka	49.27 NR	Srihari Nataraj; India	50.37	Akalanka Peiris; Sri Lanka	50.53
200 m freestyle	Matthew Abeysinghe; Sri Lanka	1:48.92 NR	Kushagra Rawat; India	1:49.64	Anand Shylaja; India	1:51.55
400 m freestyle	Kushagra Rawat; India	3:49.76 NR	Anand Shylaja; India	4:01.02	Faisal Ahamed; Bangladesh	4:12.24 NR
1500 m freestyle	Kushagra Rawat; India	15:08.83	Dilanka Shehan; Sri Lanka	16:57.12	Faisal Ahamed; Bangladesh	17:00.33 NR
50 m backstroke	Srihari Nataraj; India	24.78 NR	Akalanka Peiris; Sri Lanka	24.95 NR	Shevinda De Silva; Sri Lanka	25.79
100 m backstroke	Srihari Nataraj; India	53.63 NR	Akalanka Peiris; Sri Lanka	54.14 NR	Shevinda De Silva; Sri Lanka	56.11
200 m backstroke	Srihari Nataraj; India	1:59.69 NR	Akalanka Peiris; Sri Lanka	2:01.55 NR	Kavindra Nugawela; Sri Lanka	2:05.74
50 m breaststroke	Likith Selvaraj Prema; India	28.06	Md Ariful Islam; Bangladesh	28.36 NR	Kiran Malinka Jasinghe; Sri Lanka	28.79 NR
100 m breaststroke	Likith Selvaraj Prema; India	1:00.42 NR	Danush Suresh; India	1:02.00	Kiran Jasinghe; Sri Lanka	1:02.84 NR
200 m breaststroke	Likith Selvaraj Prema; India	2:14.76 NR	Danush Suresh; India	2:19.27	Kiran Jasinghe; Sri Lanka	2:20.68 NR
50 m butterfly	Matthew Abeysinghe; Sri Lanka	24.00	Virdhawal Khade; India	24.02	Akalanka Peiris; Sri Lanka	24.51
100 m butterfly	Matthew Abeysinghe; Sri Lanka	53.65	Mihir Ambre; India	53.74	Mahamudun Nahid; Bangladesh	55.25 NR
200 m butterfly	Supriya Mondal; India	2:02.45	Sadev Senaratna; Sri Lanka	2:06.29	Mihir Ambre; India	2:09.14
200 m individual medley	Matthew Abeysinghe; Sri Lanka	2:01.66 NR	Sridhar Siva; India	2:02.42 NR	Srihari Nataraj; India	2:09.49
400 m individual medley	Sridhar Siva; India	4:27.77	Juwel Ahmmed; Bangladesh	4:40.82 NR	Revan Senaratne; Sri Lanka	4:46.67
4 × 100 m relay freestyle	Sri Lanka (SRI); Akalanka Peiris; Matthew Abeysinghe; Stephan Perera; Kavindra Nugawela	3:19.07 NR	India (IND); Srihari Nataraj; Viraj Prabhu; Anand Shylaja; Virdhawal Khade	3:20.50 NR	Bangladesh (BAN); Mohammad Asif Reza; Ariful Islam; Mohammad Mahamudun Nahid; Mohammad Rahman	3:30.72 NR
4 × 200 m relay freestyle	India (IND)	7:27.29 NR	Sri Lanka (SRI); Stephan Perera; Dilanka Shehan; Kavindra Nugawela; Matthew Abeysinghe	7:42.48 NR	Bangladesh (BAN)	7:55.25 NR
4 × 100 m relay medley	India (IND); Srihari Nataraj; Likith Selvaraj Prema; Mihir Ambre; Virdhawal Khade	3:37.07 NR	Bangladesh (BAN); Juwel Ahmmed; Mohammed Ariful Islam; Mohammad Mahamudun Nahid; Mohammad Asif Reza	3:53.75 NR	Pakistan (PAK); Syed Tariq; Meherwan Patel; Azhar Abbas; Muhammad Khan	4:04.25 NR

=== Women's events ===
Event	Gold		Silver		Bronze	
50 m freestyle	Rujuta Bhatt Khade; India	26.34 NR	Bhakti Karunasena; Sri Lanka	26.81	Sandu Savindi Jayaweera; Sri Lanka	27.03
100 m freestyle	Gaurika Singh; Nepal	58.13 NR	Shivangi Sarma; India	58.15	Annie Jain; India	59.04
200 m freestyle	Gaurika Singh; Nepal	2:05.06 NR	Shivangi Sarma; India	2:07.19	Junayna Ahmed; Bangladesh	2:12.83 NR
400 m freestyle	Gaurika Singh; Nepal	4:25.28 NR	Shivangi Sarma; India	4:26.22	Ramudi Samarakoon; Sri Lanka	4:41.91
800 m freestyle	Richa Mishra; India	9:22.74	Ramudi Samarakoon; Sri Lanka	9:34.42 NR	Junayna Ahmed; Bangladesh	9:35.15 NR
50 m backstroke	Maana Patel; India	28.94 NR	Gaurika Singh; Nepal	29.71 NR	Ridhima Veerendrakumar; India	30.46
100 m backstroke	Maana Patel; India	1:02.36 NR	Gaurika Singh; Nepal	1:03.15 NR	Ridhima Veerendrakumar; India	1:05.72
200 m backstroke	Gaurika Singh; Nepal	2:17.73	Maana Patel; India	2:20.71	Ganga Senevirathene; Sri Lanka	2:27.25
50 m breaststroke	Chahat Arora; India	33.36 NR	Jayaveena V India	33.50	Ramudi Samarakoon; Sri Lanka	34.21 NR
100 m breaststroke	Annie Jain; India	1:13.50 NR	Chahat Arora; India	1:13.74	Ramudi Samarakoon; Sri Lanka	1:15.17 NR
200 m breaststroke	Apeksha Fernandes; India	2:38.05 NR	Duana Lama; Nepal	2:44.68 NR	Ramudi Samarakoon; Sri Lanka	2:44.71 NR
50 m butterfly	Divya Satija; India	28.00 NR	Nina Venkatesh; India	28.33	Sandu Savindi Jayaweera; Sri Lanka	28.93 NR
100 m butterfly	Divya Satija; India	1:02.78 NR	Apeksha Fernandes; India	1:03.87	Aniqah Gaffoor; Sri Lanka	1:04.85
200 m butterfly	Apeksha Fernandes; India	2:21.83	Duana Lama; Nepal	2:33.16 NR	Junayna Ahmed; Bangladesh	2:33.75 NR
200 m individual medley	Richa Mishra; India	2:25.11	Bisma Khan; Pakistan	2:32.50	Tisa Shakya; Nepal	2:33.01
400 m individual medley	Richa Sharma; India	5:03.36 NR	Apeksha Fernandes; India	5:09.74	Junayna Ahmed; Bangladesh	5:25.23 NR
4 × 100 m relay freestyle	India (IND); Annie Jain; Maana Patel; Divya Satia; Shivangi Sarma	3:55.17 NR	Sri Lanka (SRI); Bhakthi Karunasena; Sandu Savindi Jayaweera; Ganga Senevirathene; Hiruki De Silva	4:00.18 NR	Nepal (NEP); Gaurika Singh; Duana Lama; Tisa Shakya; Anushiya Tandukar	4:07.97 NR
4 × 200 m relay freestyle	India (IND)	8:41.07	Sri Lanka (SRI); Sandu Savindi Jayaweera; Ganga Seneviratna; Ramudi Samarakoon; Bhakthi Karunasena	8:54.91 NR	Nepal (NEP); Gaurika Singh	9:03.04 NR
4 × 100 m relay medley	India (IND); Maana Patel; Chahat Arora; Divya Satia; Shivangi Sarma	4:21.28 NR	Sri Lanka (SRI); Ganga Seneviratna; Ramudi Samarakoon; Aniqah Gaffoor; Bhakthi Karunasena	4:24.66 NR	Nepal (NEP); Gaurika Singh; Duana Lama; Tisa Shakya; Anushiya Tandukar	4:33.62 NR
