= Arati Saha =

Indian swimmer

Arati Gupta
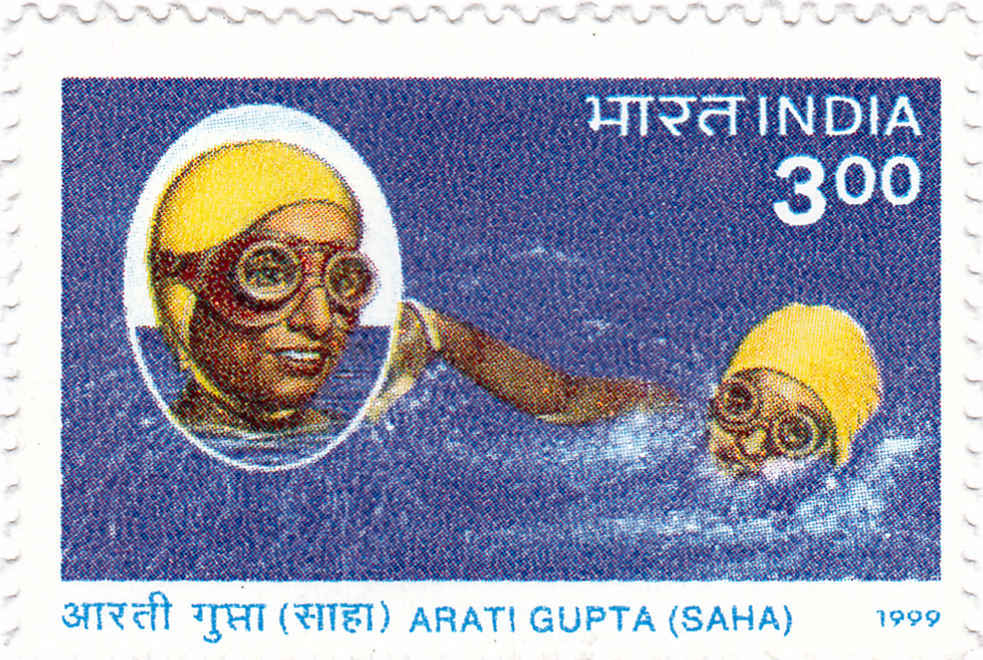
- Saha on a 1999 stamp of India

Personal information
- National team: India
- Born: Arati Saha; 24 September 1940 Calcutta, Bengal Presidency, British India
- Died: 23 August 1994 (aged 53) Calcutta, West Bengal, India
- Spouse: Dr. Arun Gupta

Sport
- Sport: Swimming
- Strokes: Freestyle, Long-distance swimming, Breaststroke
- Club: Hatkhola Swimming Club
- Coach: Sachin Nag
Medal record
Padma Shri; 1960
Women's swimming
Silver medal – second place	1948 Mumbai	100 metre freestyle
Silver medal – second place	1948 Mumbai	200 metre breast stroke
Bronze medal – third place	1948 Mumbai	200 metre freestyle

Arati Gupta (born Arati Saha; 24 September 1940 – 23 August 1994) was an Indian long-distance swimmer who became the first Asian woman to swim across the English Channel on 29 September 1959, at the age of 19. In 1960, she became the first Indian sportswoman to be awarded the Padma Shri, the fourth-highest civilian honor in India.

== Early life ==
Arati Gupta was born in Kolkata, India, as the second of three children and the first of two daughters, to Panchugopal Saha in 1940. Her father was an employee of the Indian Armed Forces. Her mother died when she was two and a half years old. Her elder brother and younger sister, Bharati, were raised at their maternal uncle's house, while she was raised by her grandmother in North Kolkata. At the age of four, she accompanied her uncle to the Champatala Ghat, where she learned to swim. Her father, Panchugopal Saha, then enrolled her in the Hatkhola Swimming Club. In 1946, at the age of five, she began her swimming career, winning first place in the 110-yard freestyle at the Shailendra Memorial Swimming Competition.

== Career ==
=== State, National Sports, and Olympics ===
Between 1945 and 1951, Saha won 22 state-level competitions in West Bengal. Her main events were the 100 metre freestyle, the 200 metre breaststroke, and the 300 metre breaststroke. In 1948, she participated in the national championship held in Mumbai. She won silver in the 100 metre freestyle and 200 metre breaststroke and won bronze in the 200 metre freestyle. She set an all-India record in 1950. At the 1951 West Bengal state competition, she clocked 1 minute, 37.6 seconds in 100 metre breaststroke and broke Dolly Nazir's all-India record. At the same meet, she set the new state-level record in 100 metre freestyle, 200 metre freestyle, and 100 metre backstroke.

Saha represented India at the 1952 Summer Olympics alongside Dolly Nazir. She was one of four women participants and the youngest member of the Indian team at the age of 12. At the Olympics, she took part in the 200 metre breaststroke event. In the heats, she clocked 3 minutes, 40.8 seconds. After returning from the Olympics, she lost in the 100 metre freestyle to her sister Bharati Saha. Following the loss, she concentrated exclusively on breaststroke.

=== Crossing the English Channel ===
Saha regularly participated in long-distance swimming competitions in the Ganges. She was inspired to cross the English Channel by Brojen Das. At the 1958 Butlin International Cross Channel Swimming Race, Brojen Das was the first man to finish, becoming the first person from the Indian subcontinent to cross the English Channel. Greta Andersen, a Danish-born swimmer representing the United States, clocked 11 hours and 1 minute, setting the fastest time for both men and women. She recommended Arati's name to the organizers of the Butlin International Cross Channel Swimming Race for the next year's event.

Dr. Arun Gupta, the assistant executive secretary of Hatkhola Swimming Club, helped to organise Arati's participation at the event. He arranged exhibitions showcasing Arati's swimming progress as part of a fundraising program. Jamininath Das, Gour Mukherjee and Parimal Saha also contributed to organizing Arati's trip. At this point, Sambhunath Mukherjee and Ajay Ghoshal approached Dr. Bidhan Chandra Roy, the Chief Minister of West Bengal, who arranged a grant of ₹11,000. Jawaharlal Nehru.

On 13 April 1959, Arati swam continuously for eight hours in the pond located in Deshbandhu Park. On 24 July 1959, she left for England with her manager, Dr. Arun Gupta. She started her final practice in the English Channel on the 13th of August. During this time, she was mentored by Dr. Bimal Chandra, who was also participating in the 1959 Butlin International Cross-Channel Swimming Race.

A total of 58 participants, including five women from 23 countries, took part in the competition. The race was scheduled for 27 August 1959 at 1 am local time from Cape Gris Nez, France to Sandgate, England. However, the pilot boat of Arati Saha did not arrive in time. By 11 am, she had swum more than 40 miles and came within 5 miles of the English coast. At that point, she faced a current from the opposite direction. As a result, by 4 pm, she could only swim about two more miles before she had to stop.

Saha prepared herself for a second attempt. Her manager, Dr. Arun Gupta, was ill, but she carried on with her practice. On 29 September 1959, she made her second attempt. Starting from Cape Gris-Nez, France, she swam for 16 hours and 20 minutes and covered 42 miles to reach Sandgate, England. On reaching the coast of England, she raised the Indian flag. The prominent Indian politician Vijaya Lakshmi Pandit was the first to congratulate her.

== Later life ==
Arati completed her intermediate studies at City College. In 1959, under the supervision of Dr. Bidhan Chandra Roy, she married her manager, Dr. Arun Gupta, and had a daughter with him. She was employed by Bengal Nagpur Railway. On 4 August 1994, she was admitted to a private nursing home in Kolkata with jaundice and encephalitis. She died as a result of the illness after 19 days, on 23 August 1994.

== Honours and awards ==
Saha was awarded Padma Shri in 1960. She was the first Indian woman sportsperson to receive the award. In 1999, the Department of Posts introduced a ₹3 denomination postage stamp of her. In 1996, a bust of Arati Saha was erected near her residence. The 100 metre long lane in front of the bust was renamed after her. On the day that would have been her 80th birthday in 2020, she was featured as a Google Doodle.

== See also ==
- Mihir Sen
- Brojen Das
- Bula Choudhury
