= Swimming at the 2022 Asian Games – Men's 50 metre butterfly =

Men's 50 metre butterfly at the 2022 Asian Games
- Venue: Hangzhou Olympic Expo Aquatics Center
- Date: 28 September 2023
- Competitors: 40 from 27 nations

Medalists
gold medal	Baek In-chul	South Korea
silver medal	Teong Tzen Wei	Singapore
bronze medal	Adilbek Mussin	Kazakhstan

The men's 50 metre butterfly event at the 2022 Asian Games took place on 28 September 2023 at the Hangzhou Olympic Expo Center.

== Schedule ==
All times are China Standard Time (UTC+08:00)

Date	Time	Event
Thursday, 28 September 2023	10:10	Heats
Thursday, 28 September 2023	19:42	Final

== Records ==
Prior to this competition, the existing world, Asian and Games records were as follows.

World Record	Andriy Govorov (UKR)	22.27	Rome, Italy	1 July 2018
Asian Record	Joseph Schooling (SGP)	22.93	Budapest, Hungary	23 July 2017
Games Record	Shi Yang (CHN)	23.46	Incheon, South Korea	25 September 2014

== Results ==
=== Heats ===
Rank	Heat	Athlete	Time	Notes
1	5	Baek In-chul (KOR)	23.39	GR
2	5	Teong Tzen Wei (SGP)	23.47	
3	5	Wang Changhao (CHN)	23.54	
3	5	Eldorbek Usmonov (UZB)	23.54	
5	4	Adilbek Mussin (KAZ)	23.65	
6	3	Mikkel Lee (SGP)	23.73	
7	3	Takeshi Kawamoto (JPN)	23.94	
8	3	Chen Juner (CHN)	23.98	
9	4	Naoki Mizunuma (JPN)	24.01	
10	4	Waleed Abdulrazzaq (KUW)	24.04	
11	5	Ian Ho (HKG)	24.06	
12	4	Kim Ji-hun (KOR)	24.12	
13	3	Jarod Hatch (PHI)	24.31	
14	3	Bryan Leong (MAS)	24.46	
15	1	Nguyễn Hoàng Khang (VIE)	24.49	
16	4	Ng Cheuk Yin (HKG)	24.50	
17	3	Joe Kurniawan (INA)	24.52	
18	5	Matthew Abeysinghe (SRI)	24.58	
19	5	Virdhawal Khade (IND)	24.67	
19	4	Mehrshad Afghari (IRI)	24.67	
21	5	Navaphat Wongcharoen (THA)	24.71	
22	3	Akalanka Peiris (SRI)	24.91	
23	4	Supha Sangaworawong (THA)	25.17	
24	4	Tameem El-Hamayda (QAT)	25.58	
25	3	Abdulrahman Al-Kulaibi (OMA)	25.95	
26	2	Lam Chi Chong (MAC)	26.01	
27	2	Musa Jalaýew (TKM)	26.11	
28	1	Mahmoud Abugharbia (PLE)	26.34	
29	2	Abdulla Al-Khaldi (QAT)	26.55	
30	2	Arslan Gaýypnazarow (TKM)	26.71	
31	2	Sodovjamtsyn Sodmandakh (MGL)	26.81	
32	2	Muhammad Ahmed Durrani (PAK)	27.10	
33	2	Mohamed Rihan Shiham (MDV)	27.67	
34	1	Saddam Ramziyorzoda (TJK)	28.16	
35	1	Fahim Anwari (AFG)	28.45	
36	2	Azhar Abbas (PAK)	28.61	
37	1	Phoumbandith Keopaseuth (LAO)	29.11	
38	1	Ahmed Neeq Niyaz (MDV)	29.12	
39	1	Slava Sihanouvong (LAO)	29.93	
40	1	Olimjon Ishanov (TJK)	30.05	

=== Final ===
Rank	Athlete	Time	Notes
1st place, gold medalist(s)	Baek In-chul (KOR)	23.29	GR
2nd place, silver medalist(s)	Teong Tzen Wei (SGP)	23.34	
3rd place, bronze medalist(s)	Adilbek Mussin (KAZ)	23.44	
4	Wang Changhao (CHN)	23.46	
5	Takeshi Kawamoto (JPN)	23.54	
6	Eldorbek Usmonov (UZB)	23.56	
7	Mikkel Lee (SGP)	23.60	
8	Chen Juner (CHN)	23.71	
