= Bangladesh at the 2024 World Aquatics Championships =

- Flag of Bangladesh
- FINA code: BAN
- National federation: Bangladesh Swimming Federation
- Website: bdswimming.org

in Doha, Qatar
- Competitors: 2 in 1 sport
- Medals: Gold 0 Silver 0 Bronze 0 Total 0

World Aquatics Championships appearances
- 1973; 1975; 1978; 1982; 1986; 1991; 1994; 1998; 2001; 2003; 2005; 2007; 2009; 2011; 2013; 2015; 2017; 2019; 2022; 2023; 2024

Bangladesh competed at the 2024 World Aquatics Championships in Doha, Qatar from 2 to 18 February.

== Competitors ==
The following is the list of competitors in the Championships.

Sport	Men	Women	Total
Swimming	1	1	2
Total	1	1	2

== Swimming ==
Bangladesh entered 2 swimmers.

Men

Athlete	Event	Heat		Semifinal		Final	
Athlete	Event	Time	Rank	Time	Rank	Time	Rank
Samiul Islam Rafi	50 metre freestyle	25.47	83	Did not advance			
Samiul Islam Rafi	200 metre individual medley	58.95 NR	47	Did not advance			

Women

Athlete	Event	Heat		Semifinal		Final	
Athlete	Event	Time	Rank	Time	Rank	Time	Rank
Mst Sonia Khatun	50 metre freestyle	30.95	90	Did not advance			
Mst Sonia Khatun	100 metre butterfly	1:17.86	43	Did not advance			
