= Bangladesh at the 2023 World Aquatics Championships =

- Flag of Bangladesh
- World Aquatics code: BAN
- National federation: Bangladesh Swimming Federation
- Website: bdswimming.com

in Fukuoka, Japan
- Competitors: 2 in 1 sport
- Medals: Gold 0 Silver 0 Bronze 0 Total 0

World Aquatics Championships appearances
- 1973; 1975; 1978; 1982; 1986; 1991; 1994; 1998; 2001; 2003; 2005; 2007; 2009; 2011; 2013; 2015; 2017; 2019; 2022; 2023; 2024; 2025

Bangladesh competed at the 2023 World Aquatics Championships in Fukuoka, Japan from 14 to 30 July.

== Swimming ==
Bangladesh entered 2 swimmers.

Men

Athlete	Event	Heat		Semifinal		Final	
Athlete	Event	Time	Rank	Time	Rank	Time	Rank
Asif Reza	50 metre freestyle	24.94	86	Did not advance			
Asif Reza	100 metre freestyle	55.84	100	Did not advance			

Women

Athlete	Event	Heat		Semifinal		Final	
Athlete	Event	Time	Rank	Time	Rank	Time	Rank
Sonia Khatun	50 metre freestyle	30.49	82	Did not advance			
Sonia Khatun	50 metre butterfly	31.51	55	Did not advance			
