= Bangladesh at the 2011 World Aquatics Championships =

Sporting event delegation

- Flag of Bangladesh
- World Aquatics code: BAN
- National federation: Bangladesh Swimming Federation
- Website: www.bdswimming.com

in Shanghai, China
- Competitors: 2 in 1 sports
- Medals: Gold 0 Silver 0 Bronze 0 Total 0

World Aquatics Championships appearances
- 1973; 1975; 1978; 1982; 1986; 1991; 1994; 1998; 2001; 2003; 2005; 2007; 2009; 2011; 2013; 2015; 2017; 2019; 2022; 2023; 2024; 2025

Bangladesh competed at the 2011 World Aquatics Championships in Shanghai, China between July 16 and 31, 2011.

== Swimming ==
Bangladesh qualified 2 swimmers.

Men

Athlete	Event	Heats		Semifinals		Final	
Athlete	Event	Time	Rank	Time	Rank	Time	Rank
Mahfizur Rahman Sagor	Men's 50m Freestyle	24.82	63	did not advance			
Mahfizur Rahman Sagor	Men's 100m Freestyle	54.18	71	did not advance			
Shajahan Ali	Men's 50m Breaststroke	30.88	40	did not advance			
Shajahan Ali	Men's 100m Breaststroke	1:10.22	75	did not advance			
