= Bangladesh at the 2015 World Aquatics Championships =

- Flag of Bangladesh
- FINA code: BAN
- National federation: Bangladesh Swimming Federation
- Website: www.bdswimming.com

in Kazan, Russia
- Competitors: 3 in 1 sport
- Medals: Gold 0 Silver 0 Bronze 0 Total 0

World Aquatics Championships appearances
- 1973; 1975; 1978; 1982; 1986; 1991; 1994; 1998; 2001; 2003; 2005; 2007; 2009; 2011; 2013; 2015; 2017; 2019; 2022; 2023; 2024

Bangladesh competed at the 2015 World Aquatics Championships in Kazan, Russia from 24 July to 9 August 2015.

== Swimming ==
Bangladeshi swimmers have achieved qualifying standards in the following events (up to a maximum of 2 swimmers in each event at the A-standard entry time, and 1 at the B-standard):

Men

Athlete	Event	Heat		Semifinal		Final	
Athlete	Event	Time	Rank	Time	Rank	Time	Rank
Mohammed Ahmed	50 m backstroke	29.10	58	did not advance			
Mohammed Ahmed	100 m backstroke	1:04.28	62	did not advance			
Mahfizur Rahman Sagor	50 m freestyle	24.43	65	did not advance			
Mahfizur Rahman Sagor	100 m freestyle	52.89	79	did not advance			

Women

Athlete	Event	Heat		Semifinal		Final	
Athlete	Event	Time	Rank	Time	Rank	Time	Rank
Sonia Aktar	50 m freestyle	30.89	98	did not advance			
Sonia Aktar	50 m butterfly	32.81	60	did not advance			
