= Bangladesh at the 2013 World Aquatics Championships =

- Flag of Bangladesh
- World Aquatics code: BAN
- National federation: Bangladesh Swimming Federation
- Website: www.bdswimming.com

in Barcelona, Spain
- Competitors: 3 in 1 sport
- Medals: Gold 0 Silver 0 Bronze 0 Total 0

World Aquatics Championships appearances
- 1973; 1975; 1978; 1982; 1986; 1991; 1994; 1998; 2001; 2003; 2005; 2007; 2009; 2011; 2013; 2015; 2017; 2019; 2022; 2023; 2024; 2025

Bangladesh competed at the 2013 World Aquatics Championships in Barcelona, Spain, between 19 July and 4 August 2013.

== Swimming ==
Bangladeshi swimmers achieved qualifying standards in the following events (up to a maximum of 2 swimmers in each event at the A-standard entry time, and 1 at the B-standard):

Men

Athlete	Event	Heat		Semifinal		Final	
Athlete	Event	Time	Rank	Time	Rank	Time	Rank
Mohammad Anik Islam	50 m butterfly	26.69	61	did not advance			
Mahfizur Rahman Sagor	50 m freestyle	24.39	50	did not advance			

Women

Athlete	Event	Heat		Semifinal		Final	
Athlete	Event	Time	Rank	Time	Rank	Time	Rank
Mahfuza Khatun	50 m breaststroke	35.63	61	did not advance			
