= Supriya Mondal =

Indian swimmer

Personal information
- Born: Supriya Mondal; 12 January 1997 (age 29) Shahpur, West Bengal, India

Sport
- Country: India
- Sport: Badminton
- Coached by: Nihar Ameen
- Event: Butterfly, Individual Medley
Medal record
Representing India
Men's Swimming
70th Glenmark Senior National Aquatic Championship-20168
Silver medal – second place	Ranchi	100m Butterfly
Silver medal – second place	Ranchi	200m Butterfly

Supriya Mondal (born 12 January 1997) is an Indian swimmer and trains at the Dolphin Academy, Bangalore under coach Nihar Ameen who has trained Olympians like Virdhawal Khade and Sandeep Sejwal. Srikanth is supported by the GoSports Foundation, Bangalore and has been part of their scholarship programme since 2012.

== Personal life ==
Supriya Mondal hails from a little fishing village in Shahpur, West Bengal.

== Career ==
=== Early career ===
Mondal won gold medal in the 100m and 200m butterfly events, and a silver medal in the 50m butterfly event at the Junior National Championships in Goa, 2009. In the 39th Junior National Aquatic Championship, Chennai 2012, Mondal took one gold and one silver in the 100m and 200m butterfly events respectively.

=== 2013 ===
Mondal represented India at the 2013 Asian Youth Games in Nanjing, China and finished 6th in the 200m butterfly event. In the 40th junior nationals in Hyderabad he won two gold and a silver, creating the national record in the 200m butterfly event along the way. At the senior nationals in Trivandrum, Mondal collected a silver in 200m butterfly and a bronze in the 100m of the same discipline.

=== 2014 ===
Mondal was awarded the best swimmer title in the 41st junior nationals in Bhopal. He finished the tournament with 5 gold and another national record. He won 2 gold and 1 silver medal at the 1st Dubai International Aquatic Championships. The youngster clocked 2:03.93s in the 200m butterfly, achieving the 'A' qualification required to compete in the same event in the 2014 Summer Youth Olympics, Nanjing, China.

== Personal ==
Born in a very modest family, Mondal's father is a fisherman and his mother a home maker. Mondal started swimming in a small pond in Shahpur, West Bengal. His talent did not go unnoticed. Sanjib Chakraborty, his mentor and husband of famous Bengali swimmer, Bula Choudhury, taught him the rules of professional swimming and helped him hone his skills. Supriya's talent was soon discovered by the GoSports Foundation in 2012, who helped relocate him to Bangalore to train under Nihar Ameen. The Foundation has since been supporting him with training, equipment as well as gaining tournament exposure.
