= Brojen Das Swimming pool =

Swimming pool

Coordinates: 23.729199°N 90.414029°E

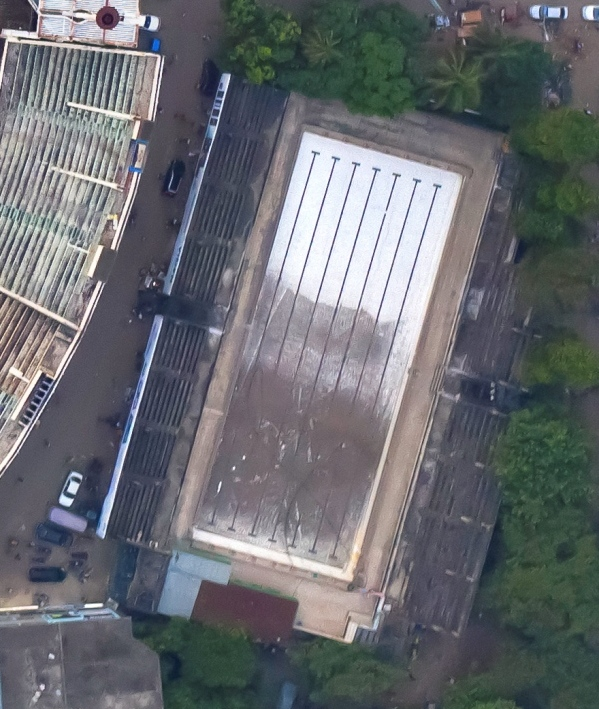
- Aerial view of the pool, 2020
- Interactive map of Brojen Das Swimming pool
- Former names: Ivy Rahman Swimming pool (until 23 March 2025)
- Location: National Stadium Complex, Paltan, Dhaka - 1000
- Owner: National Sports Council
- Operator: Bangladesh Swimming Federation

Brojen Das Swimming pool, formerly known as Ivy Rahman Swimming pool, is Bangladesh's first swimming sports organizing and training swimming pool. Built in the 1970s, the sports facility belongs to the National Stadium Complex in Paltan, Dhaka. It is one of the three swimming pools located in Dhaka city.

It was posthumously named after Ivy Rahman, an Awami League politician and victim of 2004 Dhaka grenade attack, until 2025, when it was renamed after Brojen Das, the first Asian to swim across the English Channel.

It is affiliated to the National Sports Council, like the official venues for all swimming sports events in Bangladesh. Bangladesh Swimming Federation maintains the pool.

== Events ==
Brojen Das Swimming Pool is the venue for various swimming competitions. Bangladesh Swimming Federation conducts swimming training workshops here. The pool is also used for training by private enterprises.

== Structure ==
It is an open-air swimming pool with 8 lanes. On both sides of the pool there are 5 tiered galleries with a capacity of thousands of visitors.
