= Bangladesh Navy Headquarters Central Swimming Pool =

Swimming pool in Dhaka, Bangladesh

- Interactive map of Bangladesh Navy Headquarters Central Swimming Pool
- Location: Banani, Dhaka - 1213
- Coordinates: 23.802837°N 90.405593°E
- Owner: Bangladesh Navy
- Operator: Bangladesh Navy
- Dimensions: Length: 50 metres (164 ft); Width: 17 metres (56 ft); Depth: 5.4 metres (18 ft)

Bangladesh Navy Headquarters Central Swimming Pool is a swimming sports competition hosting and training swimming pool operated by Bangladesh Navy. It is located inside the headquarters of the Bangladesh Navy in Banani, Dhaka. This venue is exclusive for BN personnel and their swimmers. Venue is used for water polo events as well.

== Structure ==
The pool is 50 meters in length and width is 17 meters. Maximum depth is 5.4 meters and can contain 25,00,000 liters water.

== Events ==
Bangladesh Swimming Federation often run residential camp here for international events. Venue is regularly used for inter-base swimming and water polo competition within Bangladesh Navy.
