= Kushagra Rawat =

Indian swimmer (born 2000)

Personal information
- Born: 16 February 2000 (age 26)

Sport
- Sport: Swimming
- Strokes: Freestyle
Medal record
Men's swimming
Representing India
Asian Championships
Bronze medal – third place	2025 Ahmedabad	1500 m freestyle
South Asian Games
Gold medal – first place	2019 Kathmandu	400 m freestyle
Gold medal – first place	2019 Kathmandu	1500 m freestyle
Silver medal – second place	2019 Kathmandu	200 m freestyle

Kushagra Rawat (born 16 February 2000) is an Indian swimmer. He has represented India in major international competitions, including the World Championships, Asian Championships, Asian Games and Commonwealth Games.
