= Aniqah Gaffoor =

Sri Lankan swimmer

Personal information
- Born: 23 January 2004 (age 22)

Sport
- Sport: Swimming
Medal record
Women's swimming
Representing Sri Lanka
South Asian Games
Silver medal – second place	2019 Kathmandu	4 × 100 m relay medley
Bronze medal – third place	2019 Kathmandu	100 m butterfly

Aniqah Gaffoor (born 23 January 2004) is a Sri Lankan swimmer.

== Life ==
She was born in 2004. While she was at school at the United World College Thailand her training schedule started at 4:30 in the morning on every day but Sundays.

In 2019, she represented Sri Lanka at the 2019 World Aquatics Championships held in Gwangju, South Korea. She competed in the women's 50 metre butterfly and women's 100 metre butterfly events. In the same year, she also won one silver medal and one bronze medal at the 2019 South Asian Games.

In 2021 it was announced that she would be going to the postponed 2020 Summer Olympics in Tokyo.
