= Bangladesh at the 2022 World Aquatics Championships =

- Flag of Bangladesh
- FINA code: BAN
- National federation: Bangladesh Swimming Federation

in Budapest, Hungary
- Competitors: 2 in 1 sport
- Medals: Gold 0 Silver 0 Bronze 0 Total 0

World Aquatics Championships appearances
- 1973; 1975; 1978; 1982; 1986; 1991; 1994; 1998; 2001; 2003; 2005; 2007; 2009; 2011; 2013; 2015; 2017; 2019; 2022; 2023; 2024

Bangladesh competed at the 2022 World Aquatics Championships in Budapest, Hungary from 17 June to 3 July.

== Swimming ==
Bangladesh entered two swimmers.

Men

Athlete	Event	Heat		Semifinal		Final	
Athlete	Event	Time	Rank	Time	Rank	Time	Rank
Samiul Islam Rafi	50 m backstroke	28.22	42	did not advance			
Samiul Islam Rafi	100 m backstroke	1:02.31	43	did not advance			

Women

Athlete	Event	Heat		Semifinal		Final	
Athlete	Event	Time	Rank	Time	Rank	Time	Rank
Sonia Aktar	50 m freestyle	30.05	70	did not advance			
Sonia Aktar	50 m butterfly	32.26	58	did not advance			
