= Nina Venkatesh =

Indian swimmer (born 2005)

Personal information
- Born: 2005 (age 20–21) Bangalore, India

Sport
- Sport: Swimming
- Strokes: Butterfly
Medal record
Representing India
South Asian Games
Silver medal – second place	2019 Kathmandu	50m butterfly

Nina Venkatesh (born 2005) is an Indian swimmer from Karnataka. She competes in the 50m and 100m butterfly events and is the Indian record holder in both the events. She represented India in swimming at the 2022 Asian Games at Hangzhou, China.

== Early life ==
Nina hails from Bengaluru, Karnataka. She started swimming at the a young age of four. Her elder sister started swimming training and her mother Ashwini Sukumar sent the younger sibling too. She is also encouraged by her father Prabhu Venkatesh. She is doing her schooling at Vidyashilp School and trains at the Dolphin Academy under the renowned coach Nihar Amin, a Dronacharya Award winner.

== Career ==
In November 2023, she won four gold medals at the National Games. In the women's 50m butterfly, she also created a record.

In July 2023, Nina broke her own National record in the 50m butterfly event at the Nationals in Bhubaneswar. She set the record in the Girls Group I competitions. In May 2023, she also broke the record in the women's 100m butterfly National record by clocking 1:02.51 at the National Aquatic Championships in Hyderabad. In June 2023, she broke the 18-year-old record of 27.12 sec set by Shika Tandon by clocking 26.65 seconds in the state sub-junior, junior and senior aquatic championships.

In July 2022, she created a National record in the 50m butterfly group I girls event at the Junior National Aquatic Championships. It was her own record which she set in Bangalore in 2021.

In June 2018, she broke a 13-year-old record, clocking 29.48 in Group II girls’ 50m butterfly at the National junior and sub-junior swimming championships at Pune. The old record of 29.83 was in the name of Lekha Kamath. In 2017, she took part in her first Senior National Aquatic Championships. In July 2014, she made her debut at the 41st Junior National Aquatic Championships held at Bhopal.
