= Naima Akter =

Bangladeshi swimmer (born 1999)

Personal information
- Nationality: Bangladeshi
- Born: 7 February 1999 (age 27)

Sport
- Sport: Swimming
Medal record
Representing Bangladesh
South Asian Games
Bronze medal – third place	2016 Guwahati	4x100m medley relay

Naima Akter (born 7 February 1999) is a Bangladeshi swimmer. She competed in the women's 50 metre backstroke event at the 2018 FINA World Swimming Championships (25 m), in Hangzhou, China.
