= Brojen Das =

Bangladeshi swimmer

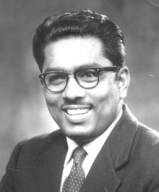
- Born: 9 December 1927; Bikrampur, Bengal, British India
- Died: 1 June 1998 (aged 70); Calcutta, West Bengal, India
- Education: Vidyasagar College (BA)
- Occupation: Athlete
- Awards: Independence Day Award

Brojen Das (Bengali: ব্রজেন দাস; 9 December 1927 – 1 June 1998) was a Bangladeshi (East Pakistan) swimmer who was the first Asian to swim across the English Channel and the first person to cross it six times.

== Early life and education ==
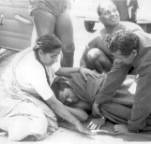
Brojen after his 5th crossing of the English Channel

Brojen was born in the Kuchiamora village of Bikrampur, Bengal Presidency, British India (now Munshiganj, Bangladesh). His father was Harendra Kumar Das. He completed the matriculation exam in 1946 from K. L. Jubilee High School (now K. L. Jubilee High School & College). He earned his Bachelor of Arts degree from Vidyasagar College in Calcutta.

== Swimming ==
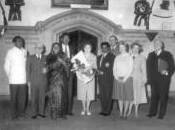
Brojen meeting Queen Elizabeth after his channel crossing (1961)

Since boyhood, Brojen practised swimming in the Buriganga River. On his initiative, the East Pakistan Sports Federation introduced an annual swimming competition in Dhaka in 1953. He was invited to take part in the English Channel Swimming Competition in 1958. As a part of his training, he swam in the Shitalakshya River, in the lower Meghna River, and a distance of 46 miles starting from Narayanganj to Chandpur. Prior to the competition, he also swam in the Mediterranean Sea from Capri to Naples.

At midnight on 18 August 1958, Brojen began swimming to cross the English Channel along with other competitors from 23 countries. He completed the course on the next day after noon.

Brojen crossed the English Channel a total of 6 times from 1958 to 1961. In September 1961, he was congratulated by Governor of East Pakistan, Lt. Gen. Azam Khan, who said "Pakistan is proud of him".

== Achievements ==
=== Local ===
- Champion in the 100-meter freestyle swimming competition in West Bengal in 1952.
- Champion in East Pakistan in 100, 200, 400 & 1500 meter freestyle swimming in 1953–1956.
- Champion in Pakistan in 100 & 400-meter freestyle swimming in 1955.

=== International ===
- Italy, July 1958, winner (placed 3rd) in the Capri Island to Naples 33-kilometer-long-distance swimming competition.
- England, August 1958, secured first position among the male competitors in the Billy Butlin's Channel Crossing Swimming Competition; 39 competitors from 23 nations participated in the competition.
- England, August 1959, successfully completed the Channel Crossing Swimming Competition from France to England.
- England, September 1959, successfully completed the Channel Swim from England to France.
- England, August 1960, successfully completed the Channel Swim from France to England.
- England, September 1961, crossed the Channel once again from France to England.
- England, September 1961, obtained the world record for the fastest swim across the English Channel from France to England.

== Awards ==
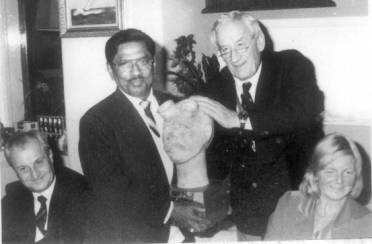
Brojen Das receiving the Letona Trophy, 1986

- 1956: Awarded by Dhaka University
- 1959: Pride of Performance award by the Pakistan government.
- 1965: Induction into the International Marathon Swimming Hall of Fame
- 1986: Letona Trophy, i.e., King of the Channel from the Channel Swimming Association of the United Kingdom
- 1976: National Sports Award, Bangladesh
- Atish Dipankar Medal
- Gold Medal by Kazi Mahabubullah Trust and Jahanara Jana Kalyan Trust
- 1999: Independence Day Award, Bangladesh (posthumous)

== Death ==
Brojen was detected to have cancer in June 1997. He went to Calcutta, India, for treatment and died there on 1 June 1998. His funeral was held at the Postagola cremation site in Dhaka on 3 June 1998.

== Legacy ==
In 2025, the government of Bangladesh named a swimming pool after him.
