= Bangladesh at the 2019 World Aquatics Championships =

- Flag of Bangladesh
- FINA code: BAN
- National federation: Bangladesh Swimming Federation

in Gwangju, South Korea
- Competitors: 3 in 1 sport
- Medals: Gold 0 Silver 0 Bronze 0 Total 0

World Aquatics Championships appearances
- 1973; 1975; 1978; 1982; 1986; 1991; 1994; 1998; 2001; 2003; 2005; 2007; 2009; 2011; 2013; 2015; 2017; 2019; 2022; 2023; 2024

Bangladesh competed at the 2019 World Aquatics Championships in Gwangju, South Korea from 12 to 28 July.

== Swimming ==
Bangladesh entered three swimmers.

Men

Athlete	Event	Heat		Semifinal		Final	
Athlete	Event	Time	Rank	Time	Rank	Time	Rank
Juwel Ahmmed	50 m backstroke	29.33	62	did not advance			
Juwel Ahmmed	100 m backstroke	1:05.00	62	did not advance			
Md Ariful Islam	50 m freestyle	24.92	92	did not advance			
Md Ariful Islam	100 m breaststroke	1:07.74	78	did not advance			

Women

Athlete	Event	Heat		Semifinal		Final	
Athlete	Event	Time	Rank	Time	Rank	Time	Rank
Junayna Ahmed	50 m freestyle	30.96	86	did not advance			
Junayna Ahmed	200 m butterfly	2:34.95	32	did not advance			
