= Akalanka Peiris =

Sri Lankan swimmer (born 2000)

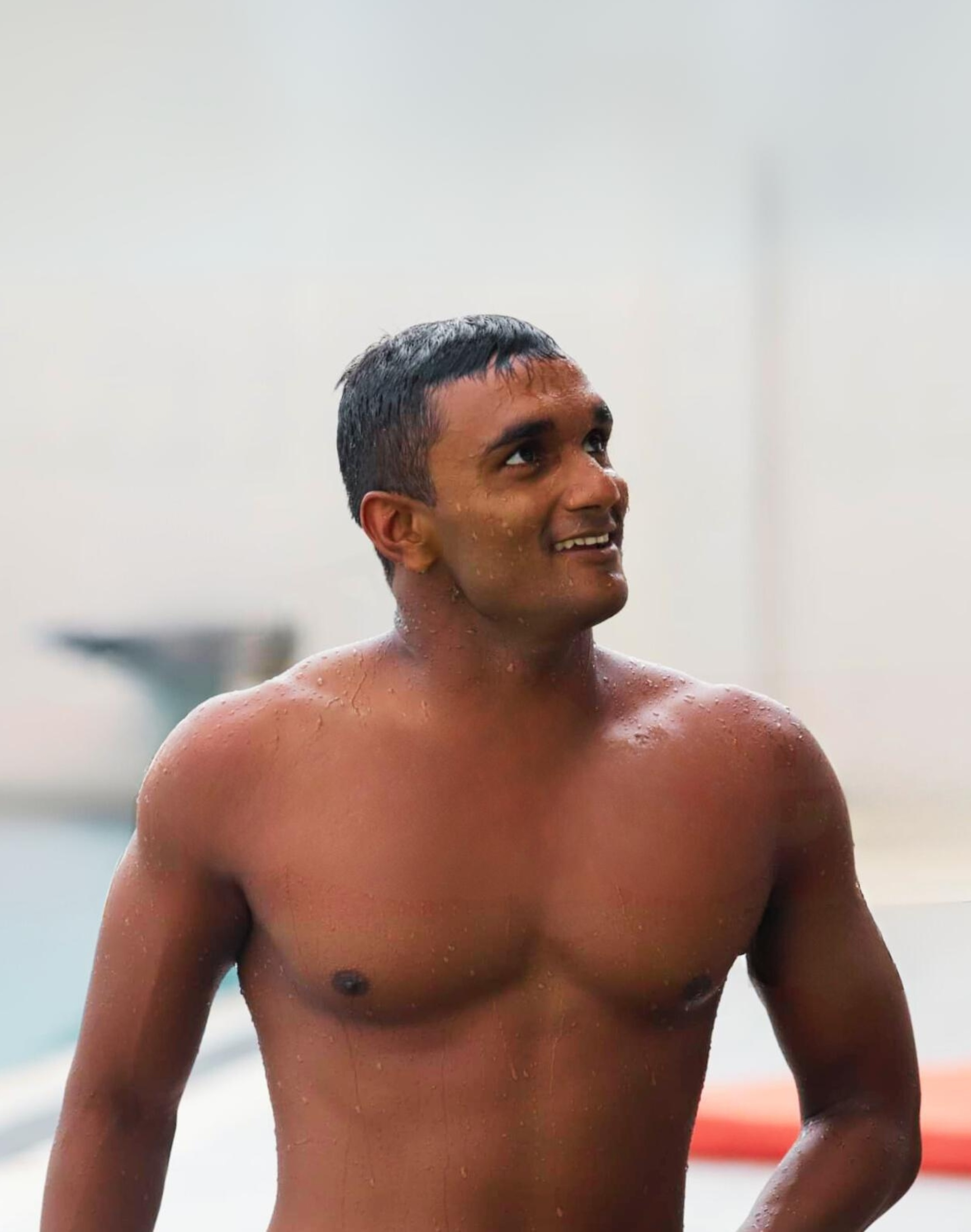
- Peiris after breaking the 50m Backstroke National Record (2022)

Personal information
- Full name: Dimuth Akalanka Peiris
- Nationality: Sri Lanka
- Born: 11 January 2000 (age 26) Colombo, Sri Lanka
- Height: 182.88 cm (6 ft 0 in)
- Weight: 78 kg (172 lb)

Sport
- Sport: Swimming
- Coach: Kelly Stubbins
Medal record
Representing Sri Lanka
South Asian Games
Gold medal – first place	2019 Kathmandu	4x100m freestyle relay
Silver medal – second place	2019 Kathmandu	50m backstroke
Silver medal – second place	2019 Kathmandu	100m backstroke
Silver medal – second place	2019 Kathmandu	200m backstroke
Bronze medal – third place	2019 Kathmandu	50m freestyle
Bronze medal – third place	2019 Kathmandu	100m freestyle
Bronze medal – third place	2019 Kathmandu	50m butterfly

Dimuth Akalanka Peiris also known as Akalanka Peiris (born 11 January 2000) is a Sri Lankan swimmer and a national record holder in swimming. He has represented Sri Lanka in various international competitions including the Youth Olympics, Commonwealth Games, Asian Games and World Aquatics Championships.

== Education ==
Akalanka Peiris attended St. Peter’s College Colombo, Sri Lanka, where he received the Peterite gold, which is presented to high-achieving students.

He completed his Certified Investment Management Analyst (CIMA) Diploma in Management Accounting and is currently pursuing a Bachelor's degree in Business Analytics in Australia.

He is currently training at the Cheltenham Swimming Club under coach Kelly Stubbins.

== Swimming Career ==
Peiris began competing internationally at the 2015 Junior World Championships in Singapore, where he earned a top 50 ranking. Since then, he has set multiple Sri Lankan national records and represented his country in major international competitions, including the Youth Olympics, Commonwealth Games, Asian Games, and World Aquatic Championships.

At the 2019 South Asian Games in Nepal, Peiris won seven medals and set national records in the backstroke and butterfly events.

In 2024, he broke the 26-second barrier in the 50m backstroke at the 2024 World Aquatics Championships in Doha, Qatar achieving a global ranking of 22nd, 3rd in Asia, and 1st in South Asia—a milestone for Sri Lankan swimming. He became a top swimmer in the Australian circuit, finishing in the top 6 for the 50m backstroke at the 2024 Australian Nationals and winning in the 50m and 100m Backstroke at the Victorian State Sprints Championships.

Over his career, Peiris has won more than 700 medals and has set 82 national age group records in domestic and international competitions.

== International Competitions ==
=== 2015 Junior World Championships ===
Peiris competed at the Junior World Championships held in Singapore, where he achieved a top 50 world ranking.

=== 2015 Asian Age Group Swimming Championships ===
At the Asian Age Group Championships in Thailand, Peiris placed 7th in the 50m backstroke and 8th place in the 100m backstroke.

=== 2016 Asian School Games ===
Peiris won silver medals in the 50m Backstroke and 50m Butterfly at the 2016 Asian Schools Games in Indonesia.

=== 2016 International Sports Games (Mini Olympics) ===
At the International Sports Games, also known as the Mini Olympics, held in Russia, Peiris earned a world ranking of 1st in the 100m backstroke.

=== 2017 Youth Commonwealth Games ===
Peiris represented Sri Lanka at the Youth Commonwealth Games in the Bahamas, where he placed in the top 5 for the 50m butterfly 50m backstroke events.

=== 2018 Commonwealth Games ===
Peiris competed at the Commonwealth Games in Gold Coast, Australia. He advanced to the semi-finals in the 50m backstroke and was a part of the 4 × 100 m freestyle relay alongside teammates Matthew Abeysinghe, Kyle Abeysinghe, and Cherantha De Silva, which reached the final.

=== 2018 Asian Games ===
Peiris was selected to represent Sri Lanka at the 2018 Asian Games in Jakarta, Indonesia, which coincided with his Advanced Level (A/L) exams. He became the first Sri Lankan to take his A/L exams overseas, completing his papers at the Sri Lankan embassy in Jakarta. At the Games, Peiris reached the finals in the 4 × 100 m freestyle relay alongside teammates Matthew Abeysinghe, Kyle Abeysinghe, and Cherantha De Silva, He also placed 16thin Asia for the 50m backstroke.

=== 2018 Summer Youth Olympics ===
Peiris represented Sri Lanka at the 2018 Summer Youth Olympics, in Buenos Aires, Argentina.

=== 2019 South Asian Games ===
At the 2019 South Asian Games in Kathmandu, Nepal, Peiris won seven medals. He earned a gold medal in the 4 × 100 m freestyle relay alongside teammates Matthew Abeysinghe, Kyle Abeysinghe, and Kavindra Nugawela. He won silver medals in the 50m, 100m, and 200m backstroke events and won bronze medals in the 50m freestyle and 50m butterfly events. During the competition, he set national records in each backstroke event and the 50m butterfly.

=== 2019 World Aquatic Championships ===
In 2019, Peiris represented Sri Lanka at the World Aquatics Championships in Gwangju, South Korea, as the only male swimmer on the national team.

=== 2019 Singapore Nationals ===
Peiris competed at the Singapore Nationals, he won a silver in the 50m backstroke and a bronze in the 100m backstroke.

=== 2021 FINA World Swimming Championships ===
Peiris competed at the 2021 World Championships in Abu Dhabi, UAE, achieving a world ranking of 37th in the 50m backstroke and 41st in the 100m backstroke.

=== 2022 Commonwealth Games ===
At the 2022 Commonwealth Games in Birmingham, Peiris continued his record-breaking performances, setting a new national record in the 50m backstroke and achieving a seasonal best in the 50m butterfly.

=== 2023 Asian Games ===
Peiris competed in the Asian Games, Hangzhou, China, where he placed 10th in Asia in the 50m backstroke (short course).

=== 2023 Australian Swimming Championships ===
At the Australian Swimming Nationals in Sydney, Australia, Peiris secured a 10th-place finish in the 50m backstroke (long course).

=== 2024 World Aquatic Championships ===
In 2024, Peiris competed at the World Aquatics Championships in Doha, Qatar, where he broke the 26-second barrier in the 50m backstroke, setting a new national record and achieving a ranking of 22nd globally, 3rd in Asia, and 1st in South Asia in this event.

=== 2024 Victorian State Sprints Swimming Championship ===
At the Victorian State Sprints Championships held in Melbourne, Australia, Peiris claimed 1st place in both the 50m and 100m backstroke events, setting new national records in both events.

=== 2024 Australian National Short Course Swimming Championship ===
At the 2024 Australian Nationals in Adelaide, Australia, Peiris achieved two more national records in the 50m and 100m backstroke events, ranking among Australia’s top 6 backstroke swimmers.

== Local Competitions ==
- Sri Lanka National Champion – 2019/2022
- National Age Group Champion – 2009/2011/2013/2014/2015/2017/2018
- Broke 82 Sri Lankan National Age Group Records
- He won 700+ International and National Medals

Sri Lankan National Records
Event		National Record Time (s)	Date	Meet	Location
Long Course (50m)	50m Backstroke	25:86	17 Feb 2024	World Championships	Doha, Qatar
Long Course (50m)	100m Backstroke	56:99	11 Sep 2017	Asian Age Group Championships	Tashkent, Uzbekistan
Long Course (50m)	50m Butterfly	24:86	29 July 2022	Commonwealth Games	Birmingham, United Kingdom
Long Course (50m)	4 × 100 m Freestyle Relay	3:22:84	6 April 2018	Commonwealth Games	Gold Coast, Australia
Short Course (25m)	50m Backstroke	24:52	28 Sep 2024	Australian Nationals	Adelaide, Australia
Short Course (25m)	100m Backstroke	53:47	27 Sep 2024	Australian Nationals	Adelaide, Australia
Short Course (25m)	200m Backstroke	2:01:55	6 Dec 2019	South Asian Games	Kathmandu, Nepal
Short Course (25m)	4 × 100 m Freestyle Relay	3:19:07	5 Dec 2019	South Asian Games	Kathmandu, Nepal
