= Bangladesh at the 2017 World Aquatics Championships =

- Flag of Bangladesh
- FINA code: BAN
- National federation: Bangladesh Swimming Federation
- Website: www.bdswimming.com

in Budapest, Hungary
- Competitors: 3 in 1 sport
- Medals: Gold 0 Silver 0 Bronze 0 Total 0

World Aquatics Championships appearances
- 1973; 1975; 1978; 1982; 1986; 1991; 1994; 1998; 2001; 2003; 2005; 2007; 2009; 2011; 2013; 2015; 2017; 2019; 2022; 2023; 2024

Bangladesh competed at the 2017 World Aquatics Championships in Budapest, Hungary from 14 July to 30 July.

== Swimming ==
Bangladesh has received a Universality invitation from FINA to send three swimmers (two men and one woman) to the World Championships.

Athlete	Event	Heat		Semifinal		Final	
Athlete	Event	Time	Rank	Time	Rank	Time	Rank
Juwel Ahmmed	Men's 50 m backstroke	28.50	46	did not advance			
Juwel Ahmmed	Men's 100 m backstroke	1:03.55	45	did not advance			
Mahfizur Rahman Sagor	Men's 50 m freestyle	24.16	82	did not advance			
Mahfizur Rahman Sagor	Men's 100 m freestyle	52.55	70	did not advance			
Mahfuza Khatun	Women's 50 m freestyle	30.73	74	did not advance			
Mahfuza Khatun	Women's 50 m breaststroke	36.53	41	did not advance			
