= Junayna Ahmed =

Bangladeshi swimmer (born 2003)

Personal information
- Born: 30 June 2003 (age 23) London, Great Britain

Sport
- Sport: Swimming
- Strokes: Butterfly; Freestyle; Medley
Medal record
Women's swimming
Representing Bangladesh
South Asian Games
| Bronze medal – third place | 2019 Kathmandu | 200 m freestyle |
| Bronze medal – third place | 2019 Kathmandu | 800 m freestyle |
| Bronze medal – third place | 2019 Kathmandu | 200 m butterfly |
| Bronze medal – third place | 2019 Kathmandu | 400 m individual medley |

Junayna Ahmed (born 30 June 2003) is a Bangladeshi swimmer. She represented Bangladesh at the 2019 World Aquatics Championships held in Gwangju, South Korea. She competed in the women's 50 metre freestyle and women's 200 metre butterfly events. In both events she did not advance to compete in the semi-finals.

In 2019, she won the bronze medal in the women's 400 metre individual medley event at the South Asian Games held in Nepal. She also won the bronze medal in the women's 200 metre freestyle, women's 800 metre freestyle and women's 200 metre butterfly events.

She competed in the women's 50 metre freestyle event at the 2020 Summer Olympics held in Tokyo, Japan.
