= Sonia Aktar =

Bangladeshi swimmer (born 1997)

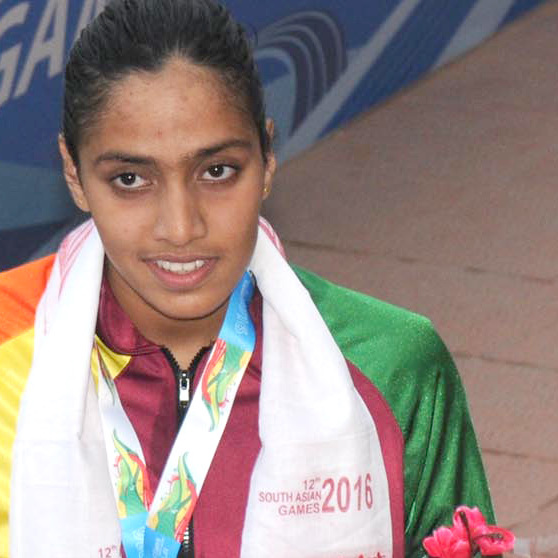
- Aktar in 2016

Personal information
- Full name: Sonia Akter Tumba
- Nationality: Bangladeshi
- Born: 15 July 1997 (age 29)

Sport
- Sport: Swimming
Medal record
Women's swimming
Representing Bangladesh
South Asian Games
Bronze medal – third place	2016 Guwahati	200m butterfly
Bronze medal – third place	2016 Guwahati	4x100m medley relay

Sonia Aktar Tumba (সোনিয়া আক্তার, born 15 July 1997) is a Bangladeshi competitive swimmer.

She competed at the 2016 Summer Olympics in Rio de Janeiro, in the women's 50 metre freestyle, where she ranked at #69 with a time of 29.99 seconds. She did not advance to the semifinal.

In 2022, she represented Bangladesh at the World Aquatics Championships held in Budapest, Hungary.
