= Mohammed Ariful Islam (swimmer) =

Bangladeshi swimmer

Personal information
- Nationality: Bangladeshi
- Born: 10 January 1999 (age 27)

Sport
- Sport: Swimming
Medal record
Representing Bangladesh
South Asian Games
Silver medal – second place	2019 Nepal	50m breaststroke
Silver medal – second place	2019 Nepal	4x100m medley relay
Bronze medal – third place	2019 Nepal	4x100m freestyle relay

Mohammed Ariful Islam (born 10 January 1999) is a Bangladeshi swimmer. He competed in the men's 50 metre freestyle at the 2020 Summer Olympics.
