= Maana Patel =

Indian swimmer (born 2000)

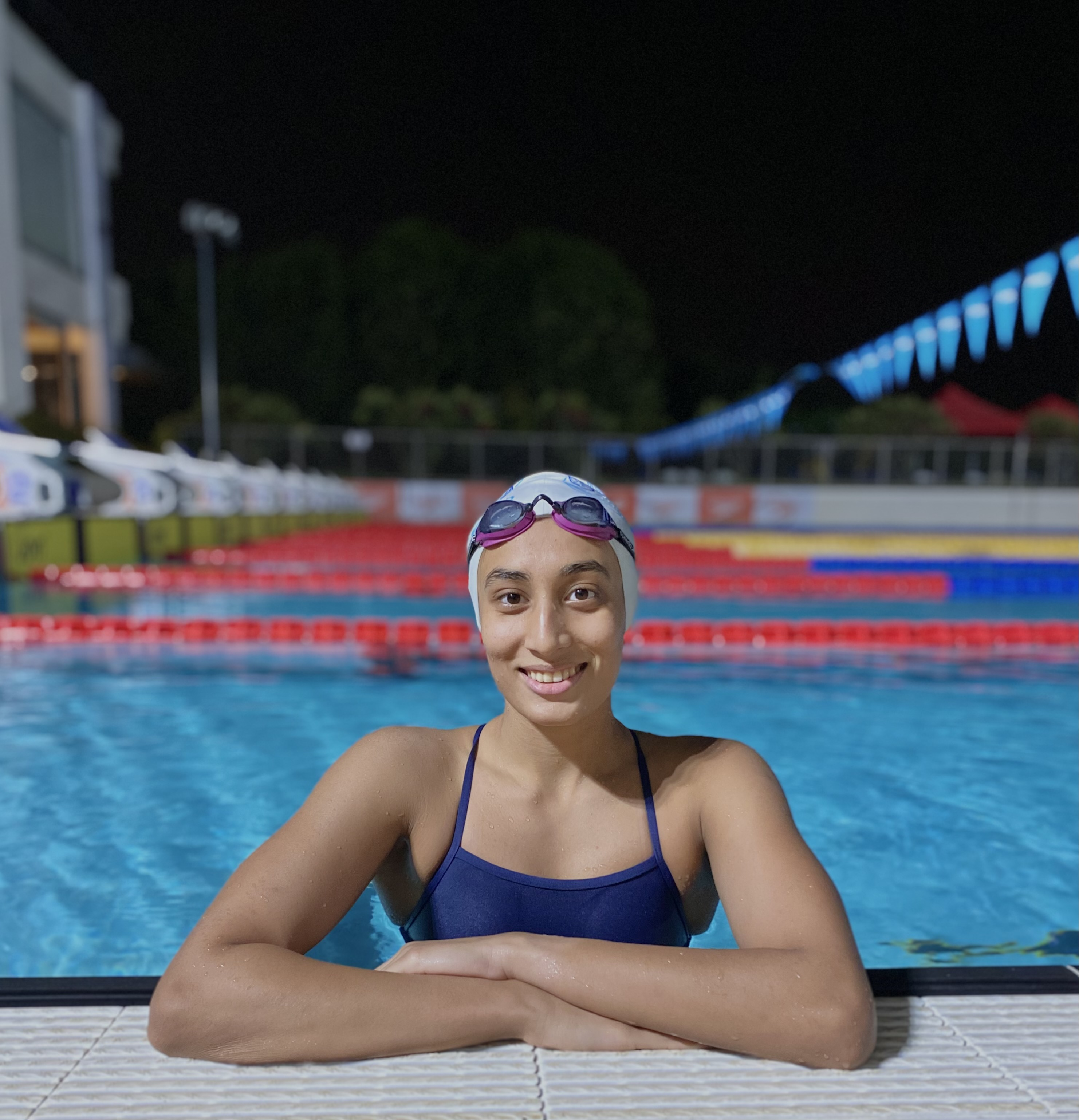
- Maana Patel during a practice session at Bengaluru in 2021

Personal information
- National team: India
- Born: 18 March 2000 (age 26)

Sport
- Country: India
- Sport: Swimming
- Event: Backstroke
- Coached by: Nihar Ameen

Achievements and titles
- Olympic finals: represented India at 2020 Tokyo Olympic Games
- Personal bests: 50 m backstroke: 29.30 (2015, NR); 100 m backstroke: 1:03.77 (2021, NR); 200 m backstroke: 2:19.30 (2015, NR)
Medal record
Women's swimming
Representing India
South Asian Games
Gold medal – first place	2019 Kathmandu	50 m backstroke
Gold medal – first place	2019 Kathmandu	100 m backstroke
Gold medal – first place	2016 Guwahati	4 x 100 m freestyle relay
Gold medal – first place	2016 Guwahati	4 x 100 m medley relay
Gold medal – first place	2019 Kathmandu	4 x 100 m freestyle relay
Gold medal – first place	2019 Kathmandu	4 x 100 m medley relay
Silver medal – second place	2016 Guwahati	50 m backstroke
Silver medal – second place	2016 Guwahati	100 m backstroke
Silver medal – second place	2016 Guwahati	200 m backstroke
Silver medal – second place	2019 Kathmandu	200 m backstroke
Bronze medal – third place	2016 Guwahati	50 m Freestyle

Maana Patel (born 18 March 2000) is an Indian backstroke swimmer from Ahmedabad, Gujarat.

== Swimming career ==
Maana Patel started swimming when she was seven.

Manna Patel, the first Indian female swimmer who qualified for the Tokyo Olympics, will compete in the women's 100m backstroke event. The 21-year-old swimmer suffered an ankle injury in 2019 and only made a comeback in early 2021.

When she was 13, she clocked 2:23.41s in the 200m backstroke at 40th Junior National Aquatics Championship in Hyderabad breaking the national record of 2:26.41s held by Shikha Tandon at the Asian Age Group Championship in Tokyo in August 2009. Maana has won gold medals in 50 backstroke and 200 metre backstroke also at the National Games. Maana has also won a gold medal in the 100 metre backstroke at the 60th National School Games (2015) breaking the national record in backstroke.

She was selected for the Olympic Gold Quest in 2015. She had won the silvers in 50 metre, 100 metre and 200 metre backstroke; bronze in 50 metre free style; gold in 4×100 metre freestyle relay; 4×100 metre medley relay at the 12th South Asian Games (2016).

Maana won 3 gold medals at the 72nd Senior National Aquatic Championships-2018.

Maana won six medals (1 gold, 4 silver, 1 bronze) at the 10th Asian Age-group Championships-2019 which was held in Bangalore.

As of October 2021, she has won 32 international, 99 national medals with 31 national records.

== Personal life ==
She studied commerce at the Udgam School for Children, Ahmedabad.
