= Matthew Abeysinghe =

Sri Lankan swimmer (born 1996)

Matthew Abeysinghe OLY
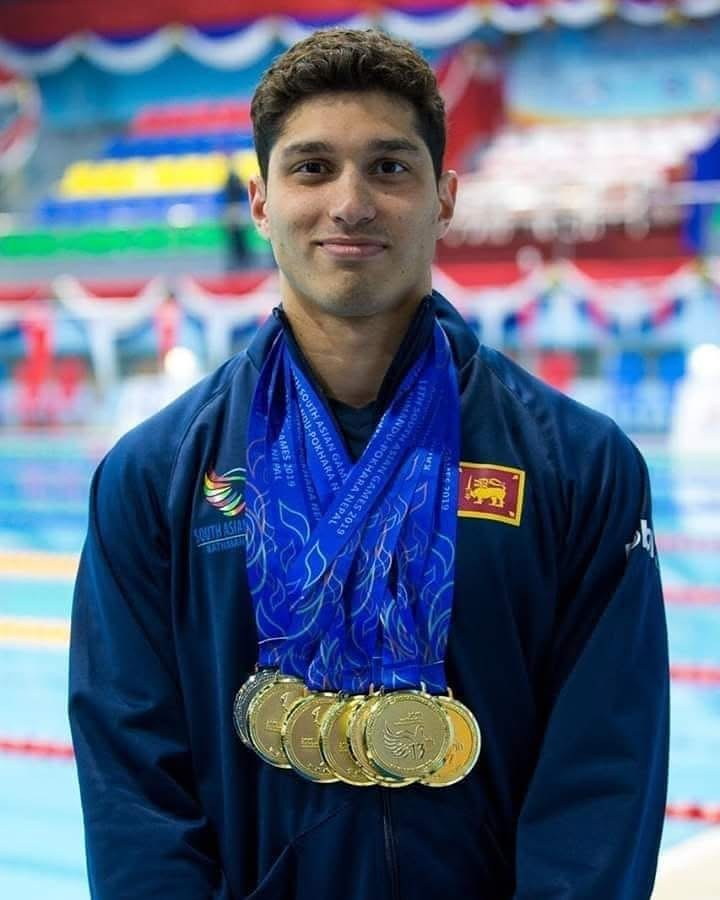
- Abeysinghe with his medal haul at the 2019 South Asian Games

Personal information
- Full name: Matthew Duncan Abeysinghe
- Nicknames: Matt, Goldenboy
- National team: Sri Lanka
- Born: 19 March 1996 (age 30) Hazleton, Pennsylvania, U.S.
- Height: 180 cm (5 ft 11 in)
- Weight: 85 kg (187 lb)

Sport
- Sport: Swimming
- Strokes: Butterfly, freestyle, individual medley
- Club: Killer Whale Aquatics - Sri Lanka
- College team: Ohio State University
- Coach: Manoj Abeysinghe
Medal record
Men's swimming
Representing Sri Lanka
Asian Age Group Championships
| Silver medal – second place | 2011 Jakarta | 100 m freestyle |
Asian Youth Games
| Bronze medal – third place | 2013 Nanjing | 100 m freestyle |
South Asian Games
| Gold medal – first place | 2016 Guwahati | 50 m freestyle |
| Gold medal – first place | 2016 Guwahati | 4×100 m freestyle |
| Gold medal – first place | 2016 Guwahati | 100 m freestyle |
| Gold medal – first place | 2016 Guwahati | 200 m freestyle |
| Gold medal – first place | 2016 Guwahati | 100 m butterfly |
| Gold medal – first place | 2016 Guwahati | 400 m medley |
| Gold medal – first place | 2016 Guwahati | 200 m medley |
| Gold medal – first place | 2019 Kathmandu | 50 m freestyle |
| Gold medal – first place | 2019 Kathmandu | 4×100 m freestyle |
| Gold medal – first place | 2019 Kathmandu | 200 m freestyle |
| Gold medal – first place | 2019 Kathmandu | 100 m butterfly |
| Gold medal – first place | 2019 Kathmandu | 50 m butterfly |
| Gold medal – first place | 2019 Kathmandu | 100 m freestyle |
| Gold medal – first place | 2019 Kathmandu | 200 m medley |
| Silver medal – second place | 2016 Guwahati | 4×200 m freestyle |
| Silver medal – second place | 2016 Guwahati | 4×100 m medley |
| Silver medal – second place | 2019 Kathmandu | 4×200 m freestyle |
| Bronze medal – third place | 2016 Guwahati | 50 m backstroke |

Matthew Duncan Abeysinghe OLY (born 19 March 1996) is a competitive swimmer who has represented Sri Lanka at numerous international competitions, during his 15 year tenure on the Sri Lankan National Swimming Team, including the 2016 and 2020 Olympics in Rio de Janeiro and Tokyo respectively. Abeysinghe is the only Sri Lankan swimmer to qualify for the Olympics. Matthew Abeysinghe is widely regarded as the greatest Sri Lankan swimmer of all time, one of the greatest South Asian swimmers of all time, and one of the most accomplished Sri Lankan athletes produced in any sport. He is the Sri Lankan national record holder in every freestyle event, the 200m and 400m Individual Medley, and the 50m Butterfly. Abeysinghe also broke the record for most number of gold medals won at a single edition of the South Asian Games, a record owned by another Sri Lankan swimmer, Julian Bolling, winning seven golds at the 2016 Games in Guwahati, India and breaking the record in again in 2019 in Kathmandu, Nepal.

Abeysinghe trained under his coach and father, Manoj Abeysinghe, with Killer Whale Aquatics, until his departure for higher education, where he resumed his training at Ohio State University in the US. His brothers, Andrew, Dillon and Kyle Abeysinghe, are all past and present members of the Sri Lankan National swimming team.

== Career ==
Abeysinghe started swimming when he was three years old alongside his elder brother, Andrew. He has been quoted, saying he started swimming merely for water safety, not to compete. Over the course of his career, Abeysinghe has achieved numerous accolades, including; international medals, national records, national championships, and several national awards. Abeysinghe is considered the greatest athlete in South Asian Games history. He is also the most decorated; winning a total of 14 gold medals, two silver medals, and one bronze medal. In Freestyle, his most proficient stroke, Abeysinghe holds all of the national records except for the 200m Freestyle, which belongs to his younger brother, Kyle. He also holds the South Asian record in the 100m and 200m Freestyle events.

Abeysinghe's first time representing Sri Lanka was at 2010 Commonwealth Games in Delhi, India. There he broke the national record in the 400m Freestyle, previously held by Julian Bolling and became the youngest male swimmer to be selected to the national team. Later on that year, he competed at the 2010 FINA World Swimming Championships in Dubai. In 2011, Abeysinghe represented Sri Lanka three times; at the 2011 World Aquatics Championships, the 2011 Youth Commonwealth Games, in the Isle of Man, making it to the finals of the 400m Freestyle, and Asian Age Group Swimming Championships, where he won the silver medal in 100m Freestyle. In 2012 Abeysinghe competed at the 2012 FINA World Swimming Championships in Istanbul, Turkey. The next year, Abeysinghe competed at the 2013 Asian Youth Games, where he won the bronze medal in the 100m Freestyle, becoming the first Sri Lankan to win a medal at an Asian Games event.

In 2014, at the 2014 Summer Youth Olympics, Abeysinghe competed in the 100m Freestyle. After setting a national record in prelims, he advanced to the semi-final, where he raced amongst the likes of future Olympians; Duncan Scott and Kyle Chalmers.

Later on, he represented Sri Lanka at the 2014 FINA World Swimming Championships in Doha, Qatar. He also competed in the 2014 Asian Indoor Athletics Championships in Seoul, Korea. In 2015, Abeysinghe competed at the 2015 FINA World Championships in Kazan, Russia. Competing at the Hong Kong Age Group Championships, Matthew achieved the "B" qualifying time for the 2016 Olympic Games, becoming the first and only Sri Lankan swimmer, and one of few athletes, to achieve this feat up to that point (his younger brother, Kyle, managed to surpass this mark later on). Abeysinghe competed at the 2016 Summer Olympics in Rio de Janeiro, Brazil, alongside fellow swimming star, Kimiko Raheem. He competed in the 100m Freestyle, with a time of 50.96.

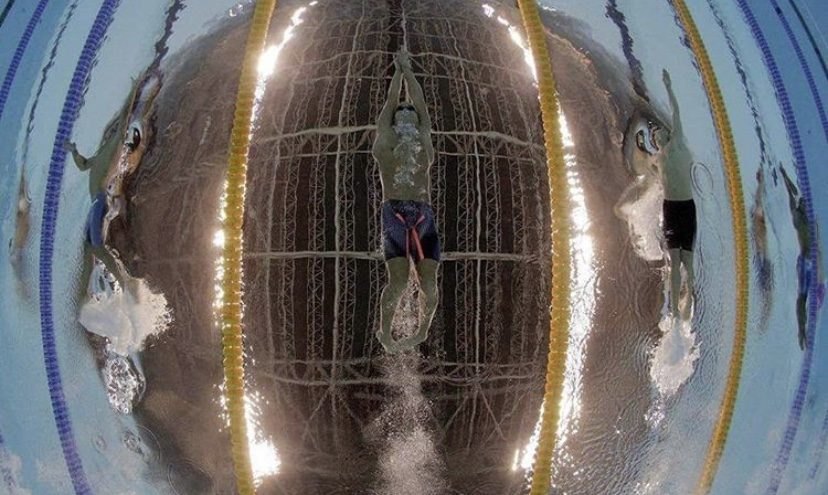
Abeysinghe competing in the 2016 Olympic Games

In early 2017, Abeysinghe moved to the US to attend Ohio State University. There he resumed training, after a prolonged leg injury in late 2016.

At the 2018 Commonwealth Games in Gold Coast, Australia, Abeysinghe was a part of the 4×100 Freestyle relay for Sri Lanka. Alongside him was his younger brother Kyle, Akalanka Pieris and Cherantha De Silva. Together, they became the first Sri Lankan team to make finals at the Commonwealth Games. Unfortunately, due to an early start, they were disqualified. At the Games, he also competed in the 50m and 100m Freestyle, qualifying for the semi-final in the latter. There he competed against the likes of Cameron McEvoy, Chad Le Clos, and Benjamin Proud. He also became the first Sri Lankan to break the "50-second" barrier.

Later on that year, he competed at the 2018 Asian Games in Jakarta, Indonesia. Again, he was a part of the 4 × 100 m Freestyle relay team alongside his brother Kyle, Akalanka Pieris and Cherantha De Silva. He also competed in the 50m and 100m Freestyle events, qualifying for the semifinal in both. A serious medal contender in the 100m Freestyle, Abeysinghe was unable to stand atop the podium, placing 5th.

Abeysinghe also competed in the 100m freestyle event at the 2020 Summer Olympics in Tokyo.

=== 2016 South Asian Games ===
With seven gold medals, two silver and one bronze (10 medals at 11 events) in 2016 South Asian Games, Abeysinghe broke the record for most gold medals in South Asian Games by a Sri Lankan, previously set by Julian Bolling back in 1991 South Asian Games. With this feat Matthew became the highest gold medal winner at a single SAG in any sport from any country!

=== 2016 Summer Olympics ===
Abeysinghe is the first swimmer ever to qualify under the Olympic Standard(B) to represent Sri Lanka in the 2016 Rio Olympic Games from 5 to 22 August.

=== 2018 Commonwealth Games ===
In February 2018, Abeysinghe was named to Sri Lanka's 2018 Commonwealth Games team. In the 50 and 100 meter Freestyle events he reached the semi-final recording a top 20 time in the world for the 100m freestyle. He was placed 10th and 14th, respectively. His time of 49.11 in the 100 Freestyle was an Ohio State University record and he became the 1st Sri Lankan to break the 50 second barrier. Along with his teammates he reached the finals in the 4 × 100 m freestyle relay, placing 8th in prelims and recording a time of 3:22.84, shattering the National and SAF record.

=== 2019 South Asian Games ===
Matthew continued his golden run at the South Asian Games and repeated his feat from the 2016 edition, winning 7 gold and a silver in the 2019 South Asian Games held in Kathmandu Nepal.

=== 2020 Summer Olympics ===
Abeysinghe overcame training challenges due to COVID and competed in the 50 and 100 Freestyle events at the postponed Summer Olympics in Tokyo in 2021.

=== 2023 World Aquatics Championships ===
After a break from swimming, Abeysinghe stormed back in dramatic fashion taking the top spot on the Sri Lankan National Team to qualify for the 2023 World Aquatics Championships in Fukuoka, Japan.

=== 2023 Asian Games ===
Continuing on from the success he had in Fukuoka, Abeysinghe represented Sri Lanka at the 2023 Asian Games where broke the 50m Butterfly National record, previously held by Akalanka Peiris.

== Personal life ==
Matthew Abeysinghe is from Colombo, Sri Lanka. He was born in the US and started his swimming career there. Matthew had a great start where he was top 5 in the US Top 16 classification as an 8 year old and was placed 1st in the 50 Butterfly. He joined the Swim America program and Killer Whale Aquatics when it was launched in 2012. He then joined Asian International School Colombo, subsequently moving to the US for higher education and training at The Ohio State University. In Sri Lanka he was coached by his father Manoj Abeysinghe, at the Killer Whale Aquatics in Sri Lanka. His family is well known for their swimming prowess in the sporting community of Sri Lanka. He has three brothers, one elder and two younger, all of whom are swimmers. His elder brother, Andrew Abeysinghe, is a former national champion, national record holder, and multiple South Asian Games gold medalist. Dillon Abeysinghe, his younger brother, is a former national champion, national record holder, and South Asian Aquatic Championship medalist. His youngest brother, Kyle Abeysinghe, is a two-time silver medalist at the Youth Commonwealth Games, one of few Sri Lankan athletes, and only swimmer, to ever achieve such a feat. At the South Asian Games level he is a gold medalist and South Asian Games record holder. At the domestic level he is also a national record holder and national champion. Their father, Manoj Abeysinghe is their coach and the four brother's hold the 4x50 Medley Relay national record. Mathew trained out of the CR&FC's swimming pool in Colombo, and his team Killer Whale Aquatics is a dominant force in the local swimming arena, where they have won the men's national championship on 5 consecutive years since 2015 and the women's national championship on 5 occasions as well.

== National and international awards ==
- Winner Ada Derana Sri Lankan of the Year for sports in 2016.
- Winner Most Outstanding Sportsman of the Year 2016 – Presidential Sports Award

== Achievements ==
=== SAF records ===
| Event | Time | | Name | Club | Date | Meet | Location | Ref |
|---|---|---|---|---|---|---|---|---|
| 50m Freestyle | 23.33 | SAG | Matthew Abeysinghe | Sri Lanka | 7 February 2016 | 2016 South Asian Games | Guwahati, India | |
| 100m Freestyle | 51.23 | SAG | Matthew Abeysinghe | Sri Lanka | 8 February 2016 | 2016 South Asian Games | Guwahati, India | |
| 200m Freestyle | 1:52.28 | SAG | Matthew Abeysinghe | Sri Lanka | 6 February 2016 | 2016 South Asian Games | Guwahati, India | |
| 100m Butterfly | 55.42 | SAG | Matthew Abeysinghe | Sri Lanka | 6 February 2016 | 2016 South Asian Games | Guwahati, India | |
| 200m Individual Medley | 2:09.63 | SAG | Matthew Abeysinghe | Sri Lanka | 9 February 2016 | 2016 South Asian Games | Guwahati, India | |

=== Sri Lanka Long Course national records ===
| Event | Time | | Name | Club | Date | Meet | Location | Ref |
|---|---|---|---|---|---|---|---|---|
| 50m Freestyle | 22.65 | NAT | Matthew Abeysinghe | Sri Lanka | 7 April 2018 | 2018 Commonwealth Games | Gold Coast, Queensland, Australia | |
| 100m Freestyle | 49.11 | NAT, OLY A | Matthew Abeysinghe | Sri Lanka | 7 April 2018 | Commonwealth Games 2018 | Gold Coast, Queensland, Australia | |
| 200m Freestyle | 1:50.97 | NAT | Matthew Abeysinghe | Sri Lanka | 19 August 2018 | 18th Asian Games | Jakarta, Indonesia | |
| 400m Freestyle | 4:03.90 | NAT | Matthew Abeysinghe | Killer Whale Aquatics | 25 September 2014 | National Aquatic Championships | Colombo, Sri Lanka | |
| 1500m Freestyle | 16:23.61 | NAT | Matthew Abeysinghe | Killer Whale Aquatics | 14 July 2012 | National Age Group Swimming Championships | Colombo, Sri Lanka | |
| 100m Butterfly | 54.33 | NAT | Matthew Abeysinghe | Sri Lanka | 3 July 2016 | Hong Kong National Age Group Swimming Championships | Hong Kong, China | |
| 200m Individual Medley | 2:07.33 | NAT | Matthew Abeysinghe | Sri Lanka | 20 October 2016 | 1st South Asian Swimming Championships | Colombo, Sri Lanka | |
| 400m Individual Medley | 4:40.47 | NAT | Matthew Abeysinghe | Sri Lanka | 13 February 2016 | 2016 South Asian Games | Guwahati, India | |

== See also ==
- List of Sri Lankans by sport
