= Nihar Ameen =

Indian swimming coach

Nihar Ameen is the pre-eminent Indian swimming coach, winner of Dronacharya Award 2015, and leads the Dolphin Aquatics across multiple centres in India one of them being the Padukone-Dravid Centre for Sports Excellence, Bangalore. Among his trainees are the first Indian athletes to qualify for the Olympics, Hakimuddin Habibulla at Sydney, 2000, Shikha Tandon at Athens, 2004 and Virdhawal Khade and Sandeep Sejwal for Beijing, 2008. He has also coached Meghana Narayan.

In 1989-1992, Ameen was assistant national team coach in the United States with Team Director and Olympic Coach, Jack Nelson.

Nihar Ameen is also a member of the panel of experts for GoSports Foundation, a sports Non-governmental organisation. He is an alumnus of the Bishop Cotton Boys' School.
