= Bangladesh Swimming Federation =

Sports governing body

- Formation: 1972
- Headquarters: Dhaka, Bangladesh
- Region served: Bangladesh
- Official language: Bengali
- Website: bdswimming.org

The Bangladesh Swimming Federation is the national federation for swimming and is responsible for governing the sport in Bangladesh. M B Saif is the general secretary of the federation. Admiral Khondkar Misbah Ul Azim, Chief of Bangladesh Navy, is the president of Bangladesh Swimming Federation.

== History ==
The Bangladesh Swimming Federation was established in 1972. It was formed by the Government of Bangladesh under the National Sports Council of the Ministry of Youth and Sports. It joined the Asian Swimming Federation in 1978 as a founding member of the Asian Amateur Swimming Federation. It has its own swimming pool, the Syed Nazrul Islam National Swimming Complex. Also often run residential camp here for international events at Bangladesh Navy Headquarters Central Swimming Pool.
