= Sri Lanka at the 2016 South Asian Games =

- IOC code: SRI
- NOC: National Olympic Committee of Sri Lanka

in Guwahati and Shillong
- Competitors: 484 in 23 sports
- Flag bearer: Manjula Kumara
- Medals Ranked 2nd: Gold 25 Silver 64 Bronze 98 Total 187

South Asian Games appearances (overview)
- 1984; 1985; 1987; 1989; 1991; 1993; 1995; 1999; 2004; 2006; 2010; 2016; 2019; 2025

Sri Lanka contested in the 2016 South Asian Games in Guwahati and Shillong, India from 5 February to 16 February 2016. The team consisted of 484 athletes (257 men and 227 women) in all 23 sports. Athlete Manjula Kumara was the country's flagbearer during the opening ceremony.

== Medal summary ==
=== Medal table ===
Sport	Gold	Silver	Bronze	Total
Swimming	12	16	11	39
Athletics	9	11	17	37
Cycling	2	2	3	7
Weightlifting	1	9	5	15
Wushu	1	1	4	6
Wrestling	0	5	7	12
Boxing	0	5	4	9
Shooting	0	4	8	12
Badminton	0	2	6	8
Archery	0	2	0	2
Volleyball	0	2	0	2
Table tennis	0	1	10	11
Judo	0	1	6	7
Taekwondo	0	1	4	5
Squash	0	1	2	3
Field hockey	0	1	0	1
Tennis	0	0	7	7
Kabaddi	0	0	2	2
Triathlon	0	0	2	2
Football	0	0	0	0
Handball	0	0	0	0
Kho-Kho	0	0	0	0
Totals (22 entries)	25	64	98	187

== Medalists ==
Medal	Name	Sport	Event
Gold	Mathew Abeysinghe	Swimming	100 m freestyle
Gold	Mathew Abeysinghe	Swimming	50 m freestyle
Gold	Mathew Abeysinghe	Swimming	200 m freestyle
Gold	Mathew Abeysinghe	Swimming	100 m butterfly
Gold	Mathew Abeysinghe	Swimming	200 m individual medley
Gold	Mathew Abeysinghe	Swimming	400 m individual medley
Gold	Cherantha De Silva Kyle Abeysinghe Shehan De Silva, Mathew Abeysinghe	Swimming	Men's 4x100m freestyle relay
Gold	Kimiko Raheem	Swimming	Women's 50m Freestyle
Gold	Kimiko Raheem	Swimming	Women's 100m Freestyle
Gold	Kimiko Raheem	Swimming	Women's 50 m backstroke
Gold	Kimiko Raheem	Swimming	Women's 100 m backstroke
Gold	Kimiko Raheem	Swimming	Women's 200 m backstroke
Gold	Jeevan Jayasinghe	Cycling	60km Criterium
Gold	Jeevan Jayasinghe	Cycling	100km Individual Road Race
Gold	Sudesh Peiris	Weightlifting	Men's 62kg
Gold	P.L.H. Lakshanl	Wushu	Men's Taolu - Changquan
Gold	Himasha Eashan	Athletics	Men's 100 metres
Gold	M.V. Suranjaya De Silva	Athletics	Men's 200 metres
Gold	Indunil Herath	Athletics	Men's 800 metres
Gold	Sri Lanka	Athletics	4×100 metres relay
Gold	Manjula Kumara	Athletics	High jump
Gold	Ishara Sandaruwan	Athletics	Pole vault
Gold	Rumeshika Rathnayake	Athletics	100 metres
Gold	Nimali Liyanarachchi	Athletics	800 metres
Gold	Sri Lanka	Athletics	4×100 metres relay

== Athletics ==
Sri Lanka's team consists of 69 athletes (41 men and 28 women)

Men

- Himasha Eashan (100m, 4X100m)
- Mohommed Ashraful (100m, 4X100m)
- Vinoj Suranjaya Silva (200m, 4X100m)
- Mohommed Rajaskhan (200m)
- Dilip Ruwan (400m, 4X400m)
- Ajith Premakumara (400m, 4x400m)
- Indunil Herath (800m),
- Hemantha Kumara (800m)
- Chinthaka Somawardana (1500m)
- Sanjeewa Lakmal (1500m)
- M.S. Pushpakumara (5000m)
- G.N. Bandara (5000m)
- Lionel Samarajeewa (10,000m)
- Saman Kumara (10,000m)
- Anuradha Cooray (Marathon)
- Amila Kumara (Marathon)
- Hasith Nirmal (110m Hurudles)
- Saliya Randeewa (110m Hurdles)
- Aravinda Chathuranga (400m Hurdles)
- C.R. Seneviratne (400m Hurdles)
- Manjula Kumara (High Jump)
- A.K. Pathirana (High Jump)
- Ishara Sandaruwan (Pole Vault)
- A.C. Fernando (Pole Vault)
- D.M. Liyanapathiranage (Long Jump)
- Amila Jayasiri (Long Jump)
- Eranda Fernando (Triple Jump)
- Dulan Thilakaratne (Triple Jump)
- Joy Dhanushka Perera (Shot Put)
- U.P. Jayawardana (Discus Throw)
- Sisira Kumara (Hammer Throw)
- E.P. Alanson (Hammer Throw)
- Sumeda Ranasinghe (Javelin Throw)
- Sampath Ranasinghe (Javelin Throw)
- Shehan Ambepitiya (4x100m)
- S.L. Wickramasinghe (4X100m)
- Umanga Surendra (4X100m)
- Kasun Seneviratne (4X400m)
- Kalinga Kumarage (4x400m)
- Madhumal Peries (4X400m)
- Anjana Gunarathne (4X400m)

Women

- Rumeshika Rathnayake (100m, 200m, 4X100m)
- Chamali Priyadarshani (100m, long jump, 4X100m)
- S.S. Jayathilaka (200m, 4X100m)
- Chandrika Rasnayake (400m, 4x400m)
- Omaya Udayangani (400m, 4x400m)
- Nimali Liyanarachchi (800m)
- Gayanthika Abeyrathne (800m, 1500m, 4X400m)
- Nilani Rathnayake (1500m, 5000m)
- S.A. Lamahewage (10,000m)
- Niluka Geethani Rajasekara (Marathon)
- Lakmini Anuradhi (Marathon)
- Ireshani Rajasinghe (100m Hurdles)
- Lakshika Sugandhi (100m Hurdles, 4X100m)
- Eranga Dulakshi (400m Hurdles)
- Kaushalya Madushani (400m Hurdles)
- Tharanga Vinodani (High Jump)
- Dulanjali Ranasinghe (High Jump)
- Sarangi Silva (Long Jump)
- Vidusha Lakshani (Triple Jump)
- Hashini Balasooriya (Triple Jump)
- Tharika Fernando (Shot Put)
- Nadeeka Lakmali (Javelin Throw)
- Dilhani Lekamge (Javelin Throw)
- Nadeeshani Waragoda (4X100m)
- S.L. Vidanaduruge (4X100m)
- Geethani Pathmakumari (4X400m)
- Upamali Rathnakumari (4X400m)
- Nirmali Madushika (4X400m)

== Field hockey ==
Men's tournament

Women's tournament

Sri Lanka's women's team was announced on 3 February 2016.

- Geethani Abeyratne
- Yamuna Wijesuriya
- Jeewanthi Keerthiratne
- Buddhika Gunaratne
- Pradeepa Nilmini
- Harshani Wickremasinghe
- Shanika Upeksha
- Geethika Damayanthi
- Nawanjana Ekanayake
- Sandaruwani Jayaratne
- Sakuntala Illeperuma
- I.D. Weerabahu
- Chathurika Wijesuriya
- Madhushani Jayanetti
- C.T. Themiyadasa
- C.D. Premasiri

== Football ==
Men's tournament

Pos	Team	Pld	W	D	L	GF	GA	GD	Pts	Qualification
1	Maldives	2	1	0	1	5	4	+1	3	Advance to Semi finals
2	India	2	1	0	1	3	3	0	3	Advance to Semi finals
3	Sri Lanka	2	1	0	1	2	3	−1	3	

Source: Futbo24
Rules for classification: 1) points; 2) goal difference; 3) goals scored; 4) head-to-head result.
6 February 2016
14:00

India	0–1	Sri Lanka
		Zarwan Johar 12'

Nehru Stadium, Guwahati
Attendance: 8000

8 February 2016
17:00

Maldives	v	Sri Lanka

Nehru Stadium, Guwahati

Women's tournament

== Tennis ==
Sri Lanka's team consists of eight athletes (four men and four women).

Men

- Harshana Godamanne
- Dinesh Thangarajah
- Sharmal Dissanayake
- Yasitha de Silva

Women

- Amritha Muttaih
- Medhira Samarasinghe
- Thisuri Molligoda
- Nethmie Waduge

== Weightlifting ==
Sri Lanka's team consists of fifteen athletes (eight men and seven women).

Men

Athlete	Event	Snatch		Clean & Jerk		Total	Rank
Athlete	Event	Result	Rank	Result	Rank	Total	Rank
Chathuranga Lakmal	−56 kg	111	1	128	2	239	2nd place, silver medalist(s)
Sudesh Peiris	−62 kg	115	1	150	1	265	1st place, gold medalist(s)
Indika Dissanayake	−69 kg	128	1	153	2	281	2nd place, silver medalist(s)
Chinthana Vidanage	−77 kg	133	2	167	2	300	2nd place, silver medalist(s)
Romesh Samarasekara	−85 kg						
Thusitha Abeykoon	−94 kg						
Chanaka Peters	−105 kg						
Saman Abeywickrema	+105 kg						

Women

Athlete	Event	Snatch		Clean & Jerk		Total	Rank
Athlete	Event	Result	Rank	Result	Rank	Total	Rank
Hansani Gomes	−48 kg	65	2	80	2	145	2nd place, silver medalist(s)
Chamari Warnakulasooriya	−53 kg	65	2	85	2	150	2nd place, silver medalist(s)
Maheshi Umera	−58 kg	61	3	81	3	142	3rd place, bronze medalist(s)
Vinodani Dharmasena	−63 kg	63	3	75	2	138	2nd place, silver medalist(s)
Chaturika Priyanthi	−69 kg	71	3	90	3	161	3rd place, bronze medalist(s)
Ashini Wickramasinghe	−75 kg						
Anushka Kaluthanthri	+75 kg						

== See also ==
- Sri Lanka at the 2016 Summer Olympics
