= Maldives at the 2016 South Asian Games =

- IOC code: MDV
- NOC: Maldives Olympic Committee

in Guwahati and Shillong
- Competitors: 184 in 22 sports
- Medals Ranked 0th: Gold 0 Silver 2 Bronze 1 Total 3

South Asian Games appearances (overview)
- 1984; 1985; 1987; 1989; 1991; 1993; 1995; 1999; 2004; 2006; 2010; 2016; 2019; 2025

Maldives participated in the 2016 South Asian Games in Guwahati and Shillong, Maldives from 5 February to 16 February 2016. Hussain Fayaz from shooting team proceed to final

== Medal summary ==
=== Medal table ===
Maldives won a total of 3 medals.

Sport	Gold	Silver	Bronze	Total
Athletics	0	2	0	2
Swimming	0	0	1	1
Archery	0	0	0	0
Badminton	0	0	0	0
Boxing	0	0	0	0
Cycling	0	0	0	0
Field Hockey	0	0	0	0
Football	0	0	0	0
Handball	0	0	0	0
Judo	0	0	0	0
Kabaddi	0	0	0	0
Kho-Kho	0	0	0	0
Shooting	0	0	0	0
Softball	0	0	0	0
Squash	0	0	0	0
Table tennis	0	0	0	0
Taekwondo	0	0	0	0
Tennis	0	0	0	0
Triathlon	0	0	0	0
Volleyball	0	0	0	0
Wrestling	0	0	0	0
Wushu	0	0	0	0
Totals (22 entries)	0	2	1	3
