= List of South Asian Games records in swimming =

The fastest times in the swimming events at the South Asian Games are designated as the South Asian Games records in swimming. The events are held in a long course (50 m) pool. All records were set in finals unless noted otherwise.

== Men ==
| Event | Time | Name | Nationality | Date | Meet | Location | Ref |
|---|---|---|---|---|---|---|---|
| 50 m freestyle | 23.33 | Mathew Abeysinghe | Sri Lanka | February 2016 | 2016 South Asian Games | Guwahati, India | |
| 100 m freestyle | 51.23 | Mathew Abeysinghe | Sri Lanka | 10 February 2016 | 2016 South Asian Games | Guwahati, India | |
| 200 m freestyle | 1:52.28 | Mathew Abeysinghe | Sri Lanka | February 2016 | 2016 South Asian Games | Guwahati, India | |
| 400 m freestyle | | | | | | | |
| 1500 m freestyle | | | | | | | |
| 50m backstroke | | | | | | | |
| 100m backstroke | | | | | | | |
| 200m backstroke | | | | | | | |
| 50m breaststroke | | | | | | | |
| 100m breaststroke | | | | | | | |
| 200m breaststroke | 2:20.66 | Sandeep Sejwal | India | February 2016 | 2016 South Asian Games | Guwahati, India | |
| 50m butterfly | | | | | | | |
| 100m butterfly | 55.42 | Mathew Abeysinghe | Sri Lanka | February 2016 | 2016 South Asian Games | Guwahati, India | |
| 200m butterfly | | | | | | | |
| 200m individual medley | 2:09.63 | Mathew Abeysinghe | Sri Lanka | February 2016 | 2016 South Asian Games | Guwahati, India | |
| 400m individual medley | | | | | | | |
| 4×100m freestyle relay | 3:30.11 | Cherantha de Silva; Kyle Abesinghe; Shehan de Silva; Mathew Abeysinghe | Sri Lanka | February 2016 | 2016 South Asian Games | Guwahati, India | |
| 4×200m freestyle relay | | | | | | | |
| 4×100m medley relay | | | | | | | |

Legend: WR – World record; AS – Asian record;
Records not set in finals: h – heat; sf – semifinal; r – relay 1st leg; rh – relay heat 1st leg; so – swim-off

== Women ==
| Event | Time | Name | Nationality | Date | Meet | Location | Ref |
|---|---|---|---|---|---|---|---|
| 50m freestyle | | | | | | | |
| 100m freestyle | 57.20 | Kimiko Raheem | Sri Lanka | 10 February 2016 | 2016 South Asian Games | Guwahati, India | |
| 200m freestyle | 2:08.68 | Shivani Kataria | India | February 2016 | 2016 South Asian Games | Guwahati, India | |
| 400m freestyle | | | | | | | |
| 800m freestyle | | | | | | | |
| 50m backstroke | | | | | | | |
| 100m backstroke | | | | | | | |
| 200m backstroke | 2:18.09 | Kimiko Raheem | Sri Lanka | 10 February 2016 | 2016 South Asian Games | Guwahati, India | |
| 50m breaststroke | | | | | | | |
| 100m breaststroke | | | | | | | |
| 200m breaststroke | 2:45.25 | Mayumi Raheem | Sri Lanka | 18 August 2006 | 2006 South Asian Games | Colombo, Sri Lanka | |
| 50m butterfly | | | | | | | |
| 100m butterfly | | | | | | | |
| 200m butterfly | | | | | | | |
| 200m individual medley | | | | | | | |
| 400m individual medley | | | | | | | |
| 4×100m freestyle relay | 4:01.95 | | India | 10 February 2016 | 2016 South Asian Games | Guwahati, India | |
| 4×200m freestyle relay | | | | | | | |
| 4×100m medley relay | | | | | | | |

Legend: WR – World record; AS – Asian record;
Records not set in finals: h – heat; sf – semifinal; r – relay 1st leg; rh – relay heat 1st leg; so – swim-off
