= Thiwanka Ranasinghe =

Sri Lankan boxer

Personal information
- Born: 5 September 1992 (age 33)
- Height: 160 cm (5 ft 3 in)

Sport
- Sport: Boxing
- Event: men's light flyweight
Medal record
Men's boxing
Representing Sri Lanka
South Asian Games
Bronze medal – third place	2016 Guwahati	49kg
Commonwealth Games
Bronze medal – third place	2018 Gold Coast	46-49kg

Thiwanka Ranasinghe (born 5 September 1992) is a Sri Lankan male boxer. He has competed for Sri Lanka at the 2016 South Asian Games claiming a bronze medal in the men's 49 kg category.

Thiwanka made his Commonwealth Games debut at the 2018 Commonwealth Games representing Sri Lanka and claimed a bronze medal in the men's 46-49kg event after losing the semi-final bout to England's Galal Yafai. He also became the first male boxer from Sri Lanka since 68 years to win a Commonwealth Games medal after Albert Perera who claimed a gold medal at the 1950 Commonwealth Games.
