= Anshul Kothari =

Indian swimmer (born 1989)

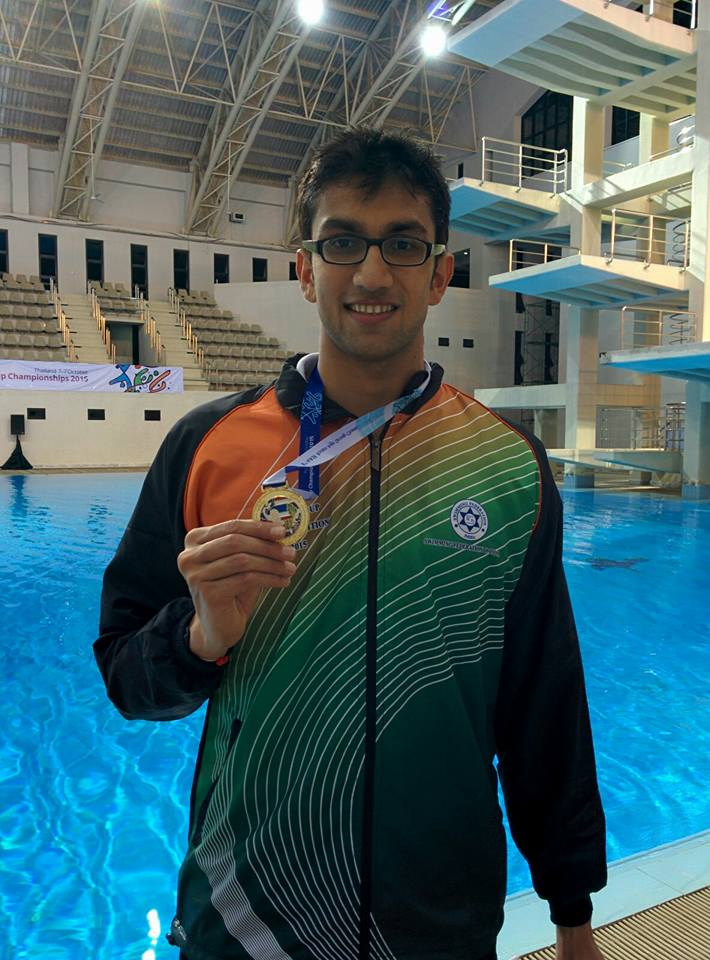
- Kothari, after winning a gold medal in 4x100 Freestyle relay at the 8th Asian age group Championships, Bangkok.

Personal information
- National team: India
- Born: 17 December 1989 (age 36)
- Education: NIT Surat (B.Tech.); Indian School of Business, Hyderabad (MBA)
- Height: 191 cm (6 ft 3 in)

Sport
- Country: India
- Sport: Swimming
Medal record
Representing India
Swimming
South Asian Games
Gold medal – first place	2016 Guwahati	4 x 100 m Medley
Silver medal – second place	2016 Guwahati	50 m Butterfly
Silver medal – second place	2016 Guwahati	4 x 100 m Freestyle

Anshul Ketan Kothari (born 17 December 1989) is an Indian competitive swimmer who has represented India in Commonwealth Games and Asian Games.

== Early life and education ==
Kothari was diagnosed with a severe flat feet condition at age of 4. Kothari has done his graduation from Sardar Vallabbhai National Institute of Technology, Surat and an MBA from the Indian School of Business, Hyderabad.

== Swimming career ==
Kothari has represented India at Commonwealth Games 2010, Asian Games 2010, Asian Games 2014 and Asian Games 2018.

=== 19th Commonwealth Games 2010 ===
Kothari represented India at the Commonwealth Games held at New Delhi. He swam in 50,100 m freestyle and also 4 × 100 m freestyle events. He swam the third leg in the 4 × 100 m freestyle relay which made history by qualifying for the finals for the first time in the history. The Indian 4 × 100 m freestyle relay quartet stood 6th in the finals.

=== National Championships 2011 ===
Kothari in the year 2011 ended a two decade gold drought for his state Gujarat by finishing at 1st position in the 50 m freestyle event.

=== 34th National Games 2011 ===
At the 34th National Games 2011 held at Ranchi, Jharkhand he won a total of two individual medals.

=== Asian Age Group Championships ===
Kothari was part of the gold medal winning teams in 4 × 100 m Freestyle Relay at Asian Age group Championships in both 2011 and 2015 editions.

=== 17th Asian Games 2014 ===
He swam in 50 m freestyle, 50 m butterfly and also the 4 × 100 m freestyle relay events. He finished at 14th position in 50 m Butterfly and 20th position in 50 m Freestyle. In the 4x100 freestyle relay, Kothari swam the lead off leg and the team finished at 6th position in the finals.

=== 70th Senior National Aquatics Championships 2016 ===
Kothari, along with the Gujarat swimming team won the gold medal and set a national record in 4 x 50m Mixed Medley Relay event with the timing of 01:53.42.

Kothari also won a gold medal in 50m Butterfly with the timing of 00:24.93, silver medal in 100m Freestyle with the timing of 00:51.94, silver medal in 50m Freestyle with the timing of 00:23.31, and bronze medal in 4x50m mixed freestyle relay event.

=== 12th South Asian Games 2016 ===
Kothari won a gold medal in 4 × 100 m medley relay, silver medal in 50 m butterfly, and silver medal in 4 × 100 m freestyle relay.

=== 9th Asian Age Group Championship, Uzbekistan 2017 ===
Kothari won a silver medal in 50m butterfly event with the timing of 00:24.84, and a bronze medal in 50m freestyle event with the timing of 00:23.28.

He also won a silver medal in 4x100 Mixed FS Relay event (along with his teammates Sahil Chopra, Damini Gowda, and Shivani Kataria), and a bronze medal in 4X200m Relay FS event (along with his teammates Avinash Mani, Sahil Chopra, Sajan Prakash).

=== 18th Asian Games 2018 ===
Kothari participated in the 4x100 m freestyle relay, Kothari swam the second leg and the team finished at 8th position in the finals creating a new Indian record in the morning heats.
