= Kimiko Raheem =

Sri Lankan swimmer (born 1999)

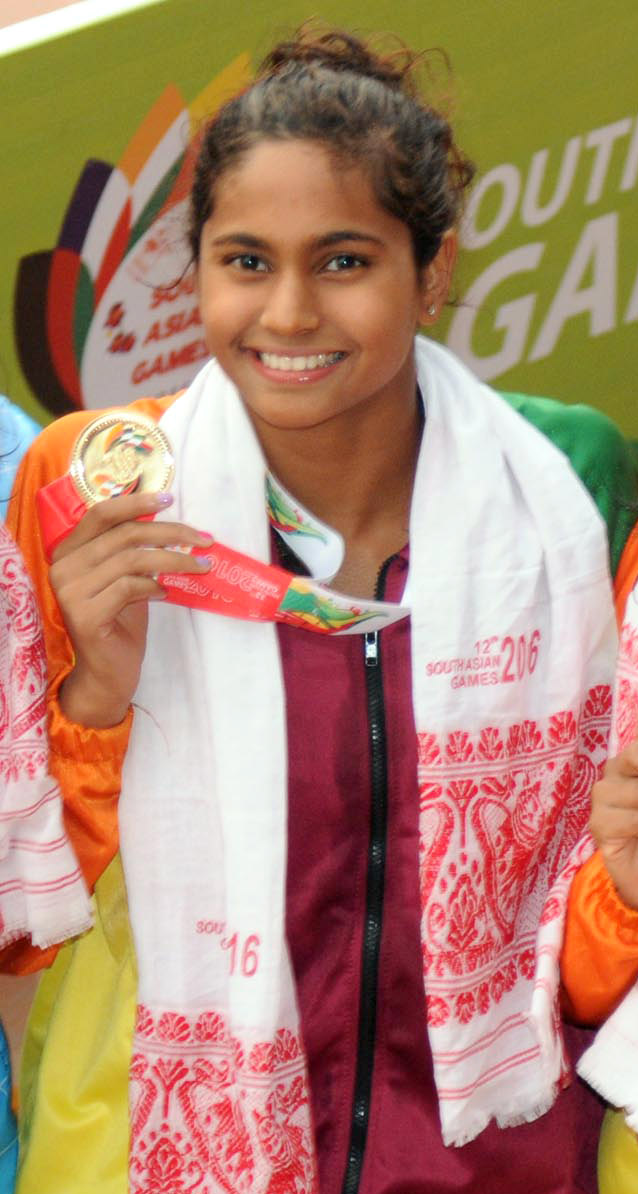

Personal information
- Full name: Kimiko Raheem
- Nickname: Kimi
- National team: Sri Lanka
- Born: 28 January 1999 (age 27) Colombo, Sri Lanka
- Height: 167 cm (5 ft 6 in)
- Weight: 55 kg (121 lb)

Sport
- Sport: Swimming
- Strokes: Freestyle, Backstroke
Medal record
Women's swimming
Representing Sri Lanka
South Asian Games
Gold medal – first place	2016 Guwahati	50 m breaststroke
Gold medal – first place	2016 Guwahati	100 m backstroke
Gold medal – first place	2016 Guwahati	200 m backstroke
Gold medal – first place	2016 Guwahati	50 m freestyle
Gold medal – first place	2016 Guwahati	100 m freestyle
Silver medal – second place	2016 Guwahati	4×100 m freestyle

Kimiko Shihara Raheem (born 28 January 1999) is a Sri Lankan national swimmer who has represented her country at several international competitions. She represented her country at the 2016 Olympic Games in Rio de Janeiro, Brazil. She won multiple gold medals at the 2016 South Asian Games in the backstroke and freestyle events. She won the highest number of medals by a Sri Lankan woman at the 2016 South Asian Games in India, and was named Best Female Athlete of the Games by the Bangladesh Sports Press Association. She is the younger sister of Mayumi Raheem and Machiko Raheem both of whom hold national records themselves. She was a semi-finalist at the 100m backstroke event at the 2014 Commonwealth Games in Glasgow. She holds numerous Sri Lankan national records and South Asian records in her name.

Raheem currently lives in Phuket, Thailand where she trained at the Thanyapura Aquatic Training Centre from mid-2015 leading up to the Olympic Games. This was under a FINA scholarship awarded to multiple swimmers from several countries. Cherantha de Silva was the other Sri Lankan swimmer who was given a scholarship by FINA. She went to the British International School in Phuket, but currently is finishing her high school in the United World College of Thailand. She has previously lived in Sri Lanka, New Zealand, Singapore and Qatar.

In February 2018, Raheem was named to Sri Lanka's 2018 Commonwealth Games team.
