= Bangladesh at the 2016 South Asian Games =

- IOC code: BAN
- NOC: Bangladesh Olympic Association

in Guwahati and Shillong
- Competitors: 409 in 22 sports
- Medals Ranked 5th: Gold 4 Silver 16 Bronze 55 Total 75

South Asian Games appearances (overview)
- 1984; 1985; 1987; 1989; 1991; 1993; 1995; 1999; 2004; 2006; 2010; 2016; 2019; 2025

Bangladesh participated in the 2016 South Asian Games in Guwahati and Shillong, Bangladesh from 5 February to 16 February 2016.

== Medal summary ==
Bangladesh won 4 golds and a total of 75 medals.

=== Medal table ===
Sport	Gold	Silver	Bronze	Total
Swimming	2	0	15	17
Shooting	1	3	3	7
Weightlifting	1	2	3	6
Wrestling	0	3	7	10
Archery	0	3	3	6
Kho-Kho	0	2	0	2
Handball	0	1	1	2
Kabaddi	0	1	1	2
Squash	0	1	0	1
Wushu	0	0	5	5
Boxing	0	0	4	4
Taekwondo	0	0	3	3
Athletics	0	0	2	2
Badminton	0	0	2	2
Football	0	0	2	2
Judo	0	0	2	2
Field hockey	0	0	1	1
Table tennis	0	0	1	1
Cycling	0	0	0	0
Tennis	0	0	0	0
Triathlon	0	0	0	0
Volleyball	0	0	0	0
Totals (22 entries)	4	16	55	75
