= Ishani Senanayake =

Sri Lankan swimmer

Personal information
- Born: 13 August 1995 (age 30)

Sport
- Sport: Swimming
Medal record
Representing Sri Lanka
South Asian Games
Silver medal – second place	2016 Guwahati	400m freestyle
Silver medal – second place	2016 Guwahati	4x100 freestyle relay
Silver medal – second place	2016 Guwahati	4x200m freestyle relay
Bronze medal – third place	2016 Guwahati	200m freestyle

Ishani Senanayake (born 13 August 1995) is a Sri Lankan swimmer. She competed in the women's 200 metre freestyle event at the 2017 World Aquatics Championships.
