= Rumeshika Rathnayake =

Sri Lankan sprinter

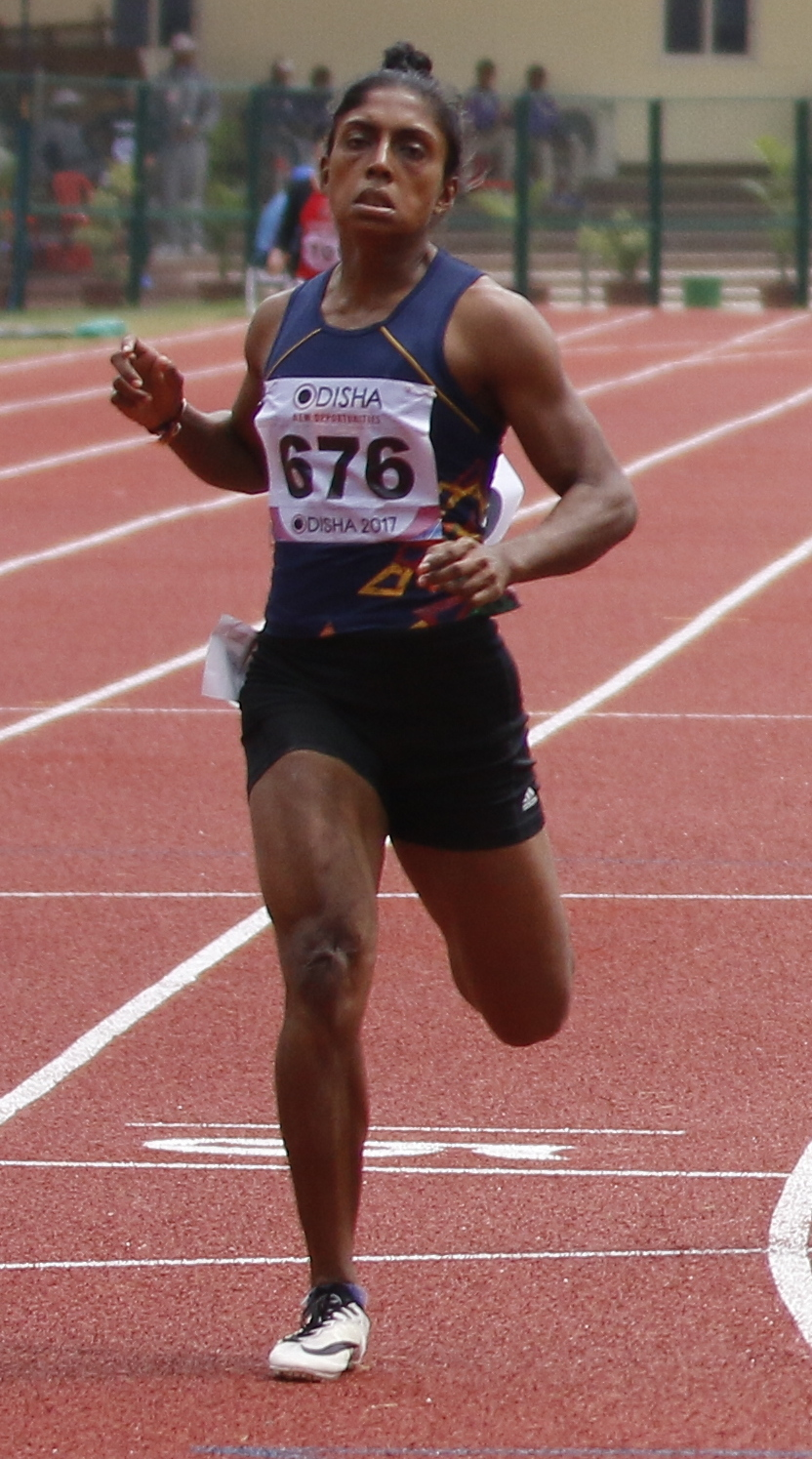
- Rumeshika Rathnayake in 2017

Personal information
- Native name: රුමේශිකා කුමාරි රත්නායක
- Full name: Rathnayake Mudiyanselage Rumeshika Kumari Rathnayake
- Nationality: Sri Lankan
- Born: 27 June 1996 (age 30) Kegalle, Sri Lanka

Sport
- Country: Sri Lanka
- Sport: Track and field
- Event: Sprint
- International level: 2016

Achievements and titles
- Personal best(s): 100 m: 11.60 (Guwahati 2016); 200 m: 23.40 (Bhubaneswar 2017)
Medal record
Women's athletics
Representing Sri Lanka
Event	1st	2nd	3rd
Asian Championships	0	1	0
South Asian Games	2	0	1
Total	2	1	1
Event	1st	2nd	3rd
100 m	1	0	0
200 m	0	1	1
4 × 100 m relay	1	0	0
Asian Championships
Silver medal – second place	2017 Bhubaneswar	200 m
South Asian Games
Gold medal – first place	2016 Guwahati	100 m
Gold medal – first place	2016 Guwahati	4 × 100 m
Bronze medal – third place	2016 Guwahati	200 m
- Updated on 11 July 2017

Rumeshika Kumari Ratnayake (born 27 June 1996) is a Sri Lankan sprint athlete specialising in the 100 and 200 meters events. She is the current fastest South Asian woman over 100 m, winning the gold at 2016 South Asian Games. She won the Bronze in the 200 m at the same games.

Rathnayake's personal best time of 23.40 in the 200 m and won the Silver at the 2017 Asian Athletics Championships.

== Personal life ==
Rathnayake was born in Kegalle, Sri Lanka and attended to St. Joseph Balika Vidyalaya.
