= Weightlifting at the 2016 South Asian Games =

Part of the South Asian Games

- Venue: Bhogeshwari Phukanani Indoor Stadium
- Dates: 6–9 Feb

Weightlifting at the 2016 South Asian Games were held in Guwahati, India from 6 to 9 February 2016.

== Medalists ==
Men

Event	Gold		Silver		Bronze	
Men's 56kg	Guru Raja; India	241 kg	Chathuranga Lakmal; Sri Lanka	239 kg	Abdullah Ghafoor; Pakistan	227 kg
Men's 62kg	Sudesh Peiris; Sri Lanka	265 kg	Bikash Thapa; Nepal	242 kg	Mostain Bella; Bangladesh	225 kg
Men's 69kg	Sambo Lapung; India	281 kg	Indika Dissanayake; Sri Lanka	281 kg	Abu Sufyan; Pakistan	275 kg
Men's 77kg	Ajay Singh; India	305 kg	Chinthana Vidanage; Sri Lanka	300 kg	Umar Lone; Pakistan	281 kg
Men's 85kg	Vikas Thakur; India	300 kg	Muhammad Tahir; Pakistan	278 kg	Romesh Selage; Sri Lanka	265 kg
Men's 94kg	Pardeep Singh; India	331 kg	Usman Amjad Rathore; Pakistan	322 kg	Thusitha Chandrthilake; Sri Lanka	293 kg
Men's 105kg	Victor Abilash Christopher; India	317 kg	Shanaka Madusanka Peters; Sri Lanka	300 kg	Azharamir; Pakistan	280 kg
Men's +105kg	Muhammad Nooh Dastgir Butt; Pakistan	360 kg	Gurdeep Singh; India	345 kg	Saman Gedara; Sri Lanka	275 kg

Women

Event	Gold		Silver		Bronze	
Women's 48kg	Saikhom Mirabai Chanu; India	169 kg	Hansani Gomes; Sri Lanka	145 kg	Molla Shabira; Bangladesh	143 kg
Women's 53kg	Harshdeep Kaur; India	171 kg	Chamari Warnakulasooriya; Sri Lanka	150 kg	Devi Kumari Chaudhary; Nepal	129 kg
Women's 58kg	Saraswati Rout; India	187 kg	Fullapati Chakma; Bangladesh	144 kg	Maheshi Umera; Sri Lanka	142 kg
Women's 63kg	Mabia Akhter Simanta; Bangladesh	149 kg	Vinodani Dharmasena; Sri Lanka	138 kg	Jun Maya Chhantyal; Nepal	125 kg
Women's 69kg	Rakhi Halder; India	194 kg	Sathy Sultana; Bangladesh	169 kg	Chaturika Priyanthi; Sri Lanka	161 kg
Women's 75kg	Kavita Devi; India	210 kg	Wickeramasinghe Selage; Sri Lanka	160 kg	Firoga Parvin; Bangladesh	148 kg
Women's +75kg	Sushila Panwar; India	198 kg	Ishani Kaluthanthri; Sri Lanka	173 kg	Tara Devi Pun; Nepal	165 kg

== Medal table ==
Rank	Nation	Gold	Silver	Bronze	Total
1	India (IND)	12	1	0	13
2	Sri Lanka (SRI)	1	9	5	15
3	Pakistan (PAK)	1	2	4	7
4	Bangladesh (BAN)	1	2	3	6
5	Nepal (NEP)	0	1	3	4
Totals (5 entries)		15	15	15	45
