= Kyle Abeysinghe =

American-Sri Lankan swimmer (born 2000)

Kyle Abeysinghe OLY
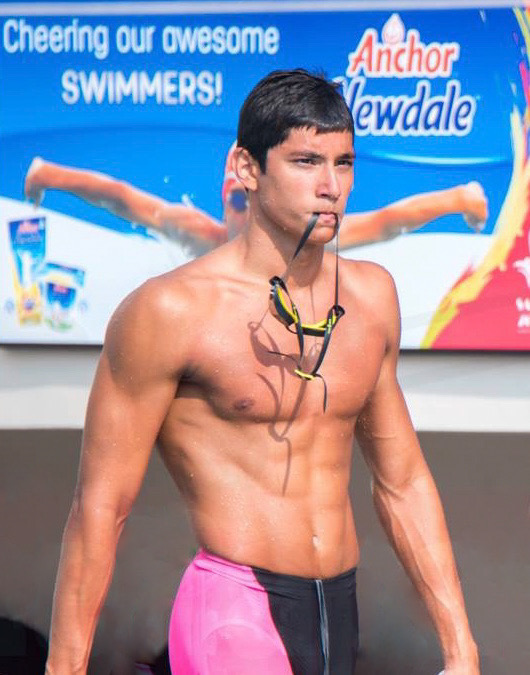
- Abeysinghe at the South Asian Aquatic Championships (2018)

Personal information
- Full name: Kyle Charles Abeysinghe
- National team: Sri Lanka
- Born: 4 February 2000 (age 26) Hazleton, Pennsylvania, USA
- Height: 185 cm (6 ft 1 in)
- Weight: 90 kg (198 lb)

Sport
- Sport: Swimming
- Strokes: Freestyle, Individual Medley, Butterfly
- Club: Killer Whale Aquatic Club
- Coach: Manoj Abeysinghe
Medal record
Men's swimming
Representing Sri Lanka
South Asian Games
| Gold medal – first place | 2016 Guwahati | 4×100 m freestyle |
| Silver medal – second place | 2016 Guwahati | 4×200 m freestyle |
| Silver medal – second place | 2016 Guwahati | 4×100 m medley |
| Bronze medal – third place | 2016 Guwahati | 400 m freestyle |
Commonwealth Youth Games
| Silver medal – second place | 2017 Nassau | 50 m freestyle |
| Silver medal – second place | 2017 Nassau | 100 m freestyle |

Kyle Abeysinghe OLY (born 4 February 2000) is a Sri Lankan national swimmer who has represented Sri Lanka country at several international competitions. Domestically, Abeysinghe holds several national records, has been a national champion multiple times, and is a member of the Killer Whale Aquatic Club, coached by his father, Manoj Abeysinghe. At the 2017 Youth Commonwealth Games in Nassau, Bahamas, Abeysinghe won two silver medals in the 50m and 100m freestyle, becoming the only Sri Lankan swimmer to win an international medal at the Commonwealth level. Abeysinghe represented Sri Lanka at the 2024 Paris Olympic Games.

== Career ==
His first time representing Sri Lanka was at the FINA Youth Programme in Doha, Qatar in 2014. Since then, he has represented Sri Lanka at the 2015 Junior World Swimming Championships held in Singapore, the 2016 South Asian Games held in Guwahati, India, where he won 4 medals: one gold, two silvers, and one bronze. Subsequently, he competed in the 2016 South Asian Aquatic Championships held in Colombo, Sri Lanka and the 2016 World Swimming Championships held in Windsor, Canada. At the 2016 South Asian Aquatic Championships he won 4 gold medals and 1 silver medal in his individual events. In addition, he helped Sri Lanka secure three gold medals and two silver medals in all five relays, bringing his medal tally to seven gold and three silver, tying his brother Matthew for most medals won. In Windsor, Abeysinghe broke two national records in the 200-meter Individual Medley (IM) and the 200-meter Freestyle. The 200m IM record was previously held by the 2012 London Olympian Heshan Unamboowe, and the 200m Freestyle record was held by his elder brother, Olympian Matthew Abeysinghe.

At the 2017 Commonwealth Youth Games in Nassau, Bahamas, he won two silver medals in the 50m and 100m Freestyle events. He became one of the very few Sri Lankan athletes, and the only swimmer, to ever medal at a Commonwealth Games event. Just a few months later, Abeysinghe competed at the 2017 FINA World Junior Swimming Championships. In early 2018, Abeysinghe competed at the 2018 Commonwealth Games in Gold Coast, Australia. There, he was part of the 4x100 Freestyle Relay, the first Sri Lankan swimming relay team to ever make the final at the Commonwealth Games. Later that year, during the 2018 Asian Games in Jakarta, Indonesia, Abeysinghe swam the second-fastest 100m Freestyle by a Sri Lankan, behind only his elder brother, Matthew. Subsequently, Abeysinghe was selected to represent his country at the 2018 Summer Youth Olympics in Argentina, but due to medical reasons, he was unable to compete. In December 2018, Abeysinghe competed at the 2018 FINA World Swimming Championships (25 m) in Hangzhou, China.

=== 2014 Fina Youth Programme ===
Abeysinghe was one of two swimmers chosen to represent Sri Lanka at the FINA Youth Programme in Doha, Qatar.

=== 2015 Junior World Championships ===
Abeysinghe was chosen to represent Sri Lanka at the Junior World Championships held in Singapore. He swam the 50-meter, 100-meter, and 200-meter Freestyle events, along with the 200-meter Individual Medley.

=== 2016 South Asian Games ===
In December 2015, Abeysinghe was named to the large contingent of swimmers chosen to represent Sri Lanka at the South Asian Games in Guwahati, India, in February 2016. Abeysinghe, 15 years old at the time, was a part of the 4 × 100 m Freestyle relay team that made history by winning the event. He also earned two silver medals in the 4 × 200 m Freestyle relay and the 4 × 100 m Medley relay, as well as a bronze medal in his only individual event, the 400m Freestyle.

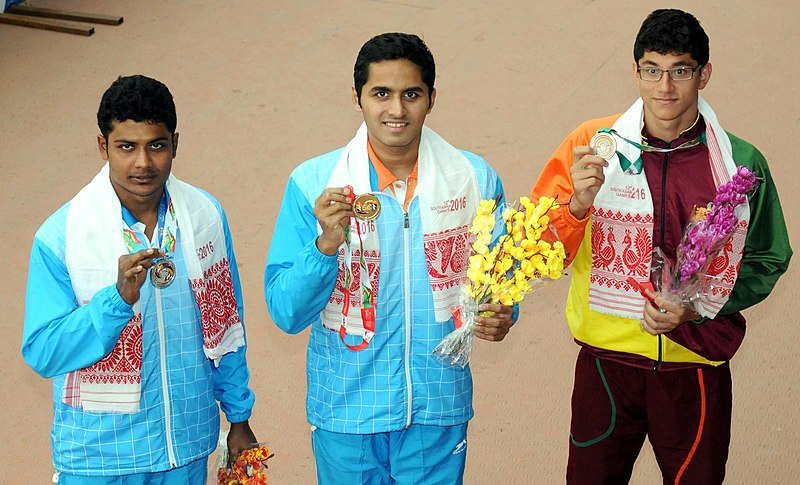
Abeysinghe at the 2016 South Asian Games

=== 2016 South Asian Aquatic Championships ===
Abeysinghe won seven gold medals and three silver medals, his highest tally at any international competition.

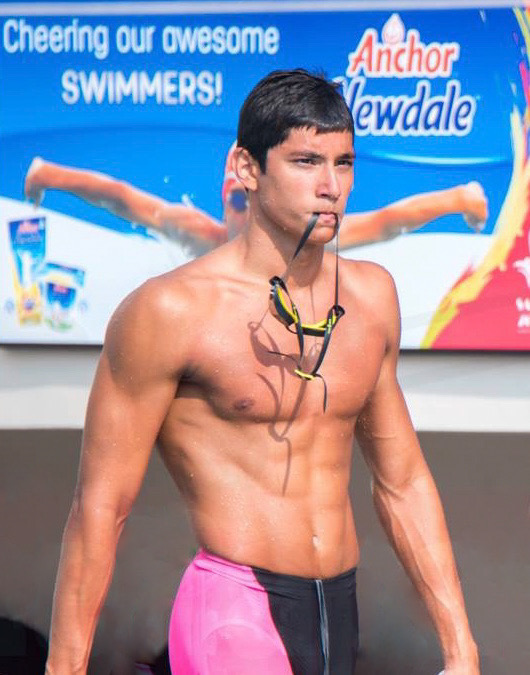
Abeysinghe at the 2016 South Asian Aquatic Championships

=== 2016 World Championships ===
Following his performance at the SAAC, Abeysinghe was chosen to represent Sri Lanka at the World Championships held in Windsor, Canada. In Windsor, Abeysinghe broke two national records in the 200m Freestyle and 200m IM, one previously held by his older brother Matthew and the other by Heshan Unamboowe.

=== 2017 Commonwealth Youth Games ===
In July 2017, Abeysinghe was named to Sri Lanka's 2017 Commonwealth Youth Games team. During the competition, he won two silver medals in the men's 100m and 50m freestyle events, marking Sri Lanka's first-ever swimming medals at either the Youth or Senior Commonwealth Games.

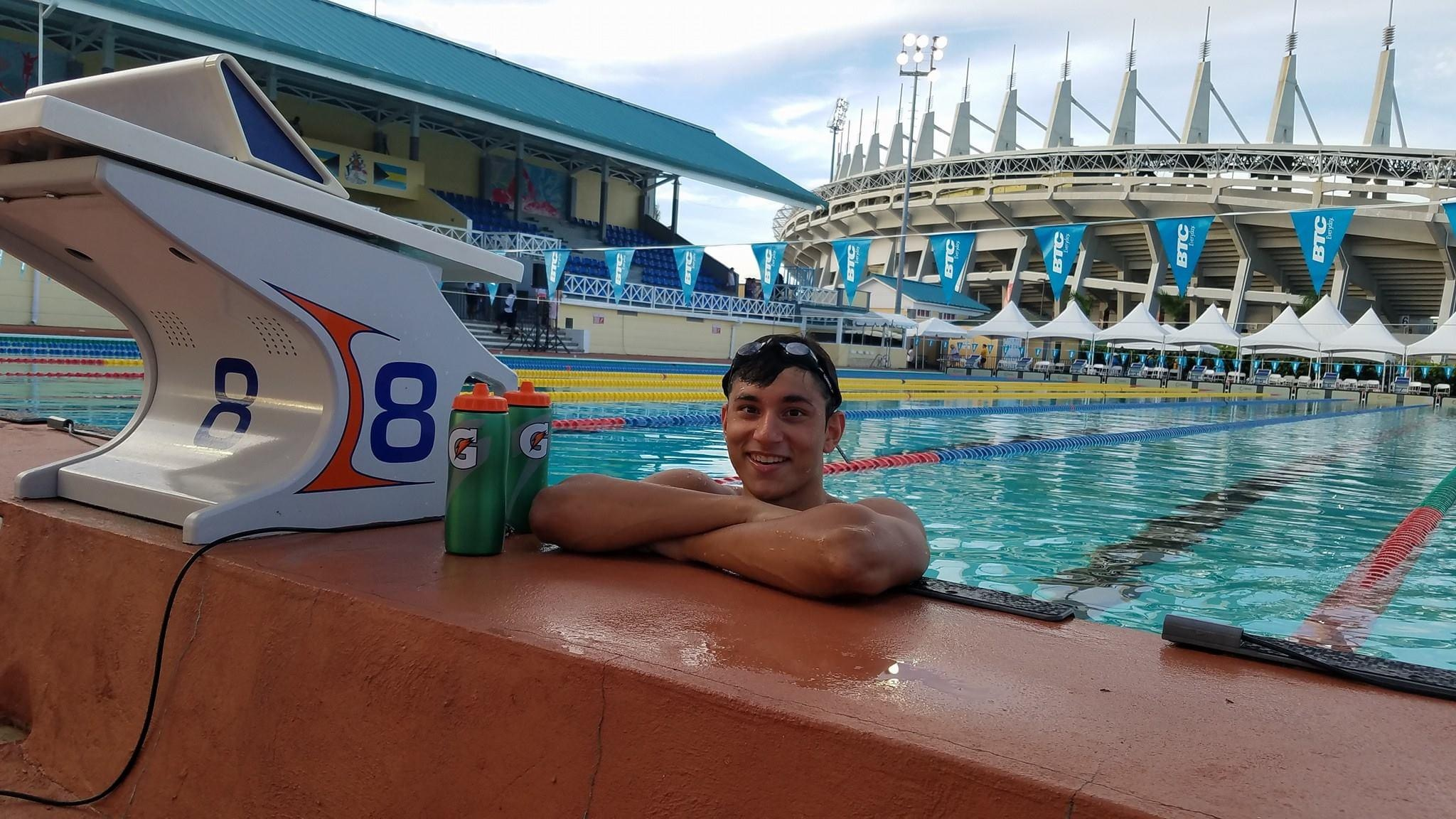
Abeysinghe at the 2017 Commonwealth Youth Games

=== 2017 Junior World Championships ===
Following his performance at the Youth Commonwealth Games, Abeysinghe was chosen for the Sri Lankan national team for the Junior World Championships in Indianapolis, USA.

=== 2018 Commonwealth Games ===
In February 2018, Abeysinghe was named to Sri Lanka's 2018 Commonwealth Games team. He helped make Sri Lankan swimming history in the 4 × 100 m Freestyle relay by qualifying for the first-ever final at a Commonwealth Games. Unfortunately, they were disqualified in the final due to an early start by the anchor leg.

=== 2018 Asian Games ===
Abeysinghe was named to the 2018 Asian Games team in July of the same year after winning three events at the Asian Games Trial held at Sugathadasa Stadium. At the Asian Games, his times of 23.36 and 50.14 in the 50m and 100m Freestyle events, respectively, were the second-fastest times in Sri Lankan history, behind only his elder brother Matthew Abeysinghe.

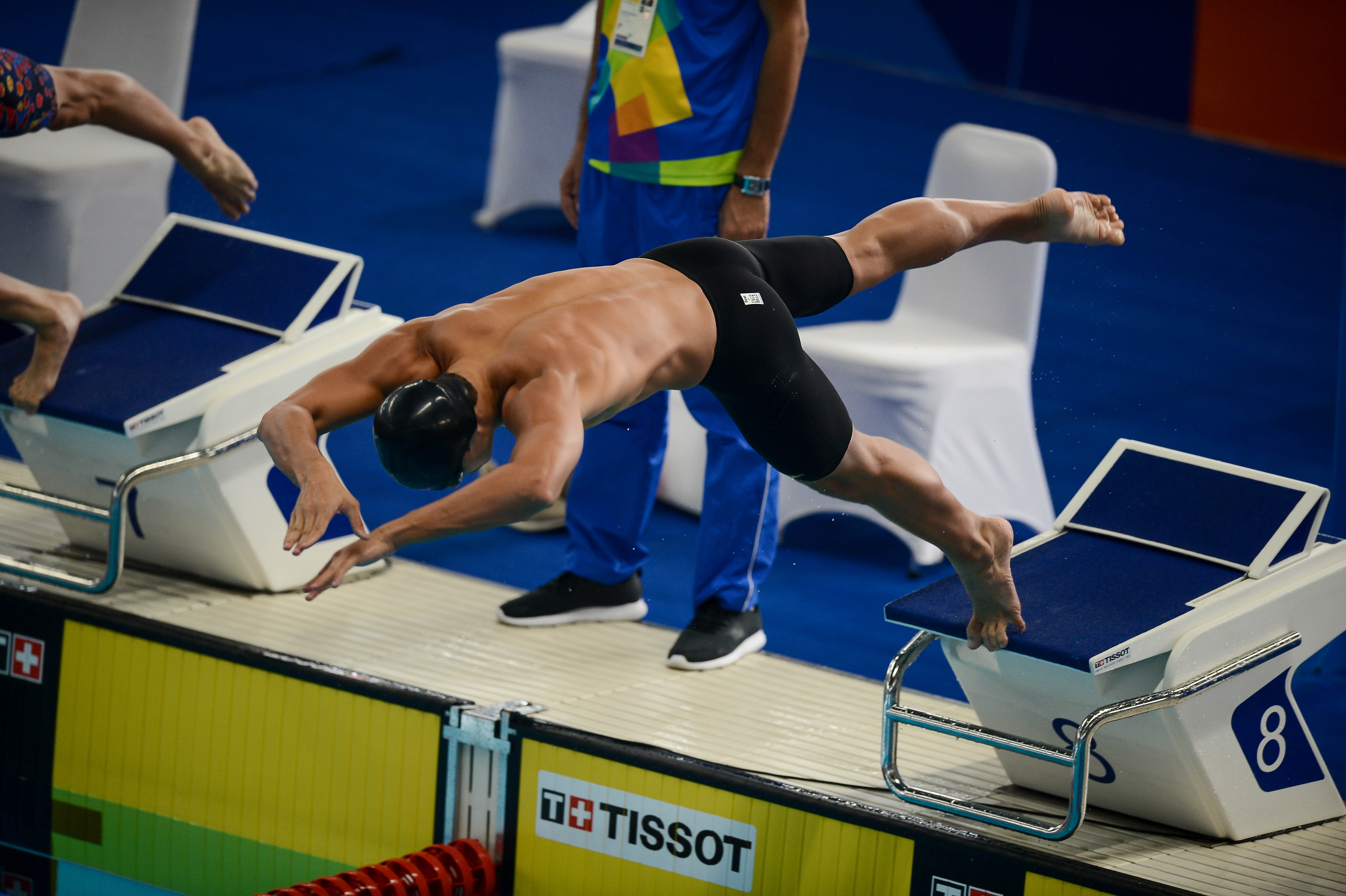
Abeysinghe competing at the 2018 Asian Games

== Personal life ==
Abeysinghe lives in Colombo, Sri Lanka, and attended Wycherley International School. He trains under his swim coach and father, Manoj Abeysinghe, at the Killer Whale Aquatic Club (KWA). Kyle has four elder brothers, all swimmers.
