= Cherantha de Silva =

Sri Lankan swimmer (born 1996)

Cherantha De Silva
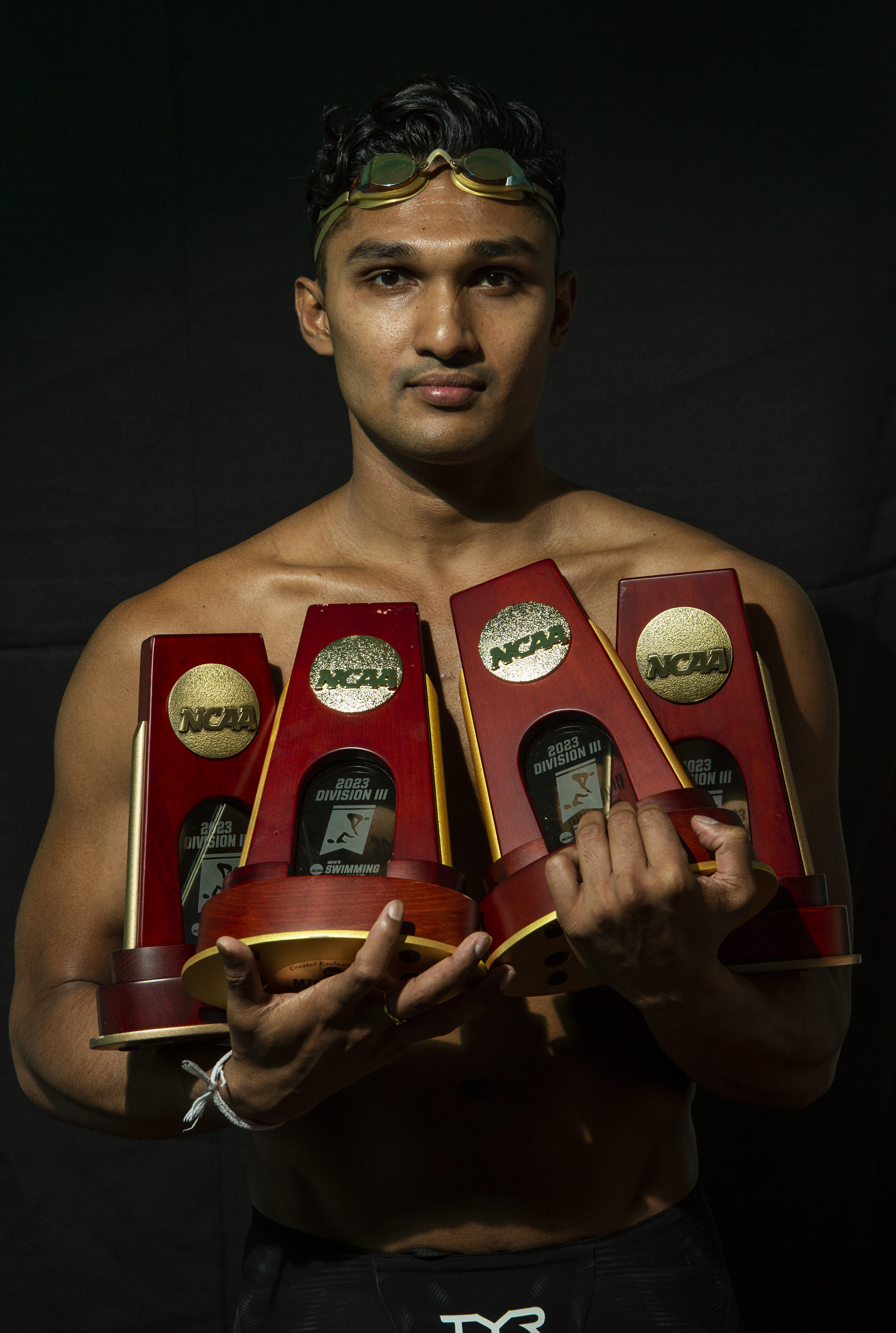
- World Championship Swimmer Cherantha De Silva with his NCAA trophies

Personal information
- Full name: K. T. Cherantha Gihash De Silva
- Nickname: "Cheran"
- National team: Sri Lanka
- Born: 12 July 1996 (age 30) Colombo, Sri Lanka
- Height: 1.77 m (5 ft 9 1/2 in)
- Weight: 73 kg (161 lb)

Sport
- Sport: Swimming
- Strokes: Freestyle and Butterfly
- Club: Thanyapura
- College team: Kenyon College, Gambier
- Coach: Miguel Lopez
Medal record
Men's swimming
Representing Sri Lanka
2016 South Asian Games
Gold medal – first place	2016 Guwahati	4 × 100m Freestyle
Silver medal – second place	2016 Guwahati	100m freestyle
Silver medal – second place	2016 Guwahati	200m Butterfly
Silver medal – second place	2016 Guwahati	4 x 100m Medley
Silver medal – second place	2016 Guwahati	4 x 200m Free
Bronze medal – third place	2016 Guwahati	100m Butterfly
Bronze medal – third place	2016 Guwahati	50m Butterfly
Men's swimming
Representing Kenyon Swim & Dive
NCAA Division III men's swimming and diving championships
Gold medal – first place	NCAA Championships	4 × 50y Freestyle
Gold medal – first place	NCAA Championships	4 × 100y Freestyle
2023 NCAA All-American Honors
Gold medal – first place	200y Medley Relay	1st Team
Gold medal – first place	200y Freestyle Relay	1st Team
Gold medal – first place	100y Butterfly	1st Team
Silver medal – second place	100y Freestyle	2nd Team
Silver medal – second place	50y Freestyle	2nd Team
2020 NCAA All-American Honors
Gold medal – first place	100y Butterfly	1st Team
Gold medal – first place	200 Butterfly	1st Team
Gold medal – first place	200y Freestyle Relay	1st Team
Gold medal – first place	200y Medley Relay	1st Team

Cherantha De Silva (born 12 July 1996) is a Sri Lankan medal-winning swimmer, who has represented his country at 6 World Aquatics Championships, 3 FINA World Cup's, 2 Commonwealth Games(becoming a finalist), 1 Asian Games as well as 1 South Asian Games, winning 7 medals. De Silva shattered 10 Sri Lankan national records and 4 internationally recognized records (more details below). Further, De Silva qualified with 4 World championship B standards(B cuts) for the 2018, 14th FINA World Swimming Championships (25 m) held in Hangzhou, China. He narrowly missed the A standard (A cut) in the 50m Butterfly (SCM) clocking 23.48. While the A standard could have made history for Sri Lanka as the first Sri Lankan to achieve the A standard he missed it by 0.2 seconds. Also, De Silva was bestowed the "Best Sportsman of the Year" award at the school level, provincial and Sri Lanka school level.

To top off his swim career De Silva earned a full scholarship to study in the US at Kenyon College, Gambier, Ohio. He earned a bachelor's degree in Economics and earned honors in his Integrated Program in Humane Studies concentration.

== Collegiate career ==
At Kenyon College De Silva was also able to excel both academically, athletically, and in his professional career. As an Economics major and Integrated Program in Humane Studies(IPHS) minor, De Silva was a multiple merit list awardee for distinguishing himself with academic success and the College recognizes this honor with a notation on his official transcript. De Silva went on to be inducted into the Alpha Iota Sigma honors society for his outstanding work in IPHS along with all other IPHS minors. It is noteworthy that Kenyon is the most expensive college in the world as of June 20, 2023.

Additionally, De Silva was able to conduct Kenyon's first Virtual Reality demo where he mentioned the following: " I want to revolutionize the traditional classroom in Kenyon College because I feel like in the 1980s we were using chalkboards and whiteboards, but now we’re using projectors and laptops." De Silva found ways to study, perform in varsity elite sport as well as to contribute to Kenyon in various ways such as the above. In De Silva's junior year, he studied abroad in Milan, Italy, and Copenhagen, Denmark focusing on Entrepreneurship and Econometrics.

Athletically De Silva performed at Kenyon's highest level at the NCAA Men's Division III Swimming and Diving Championships. He was able to become a 2-time NCAA National Champion and earned a total of 10X All-American titles, became an NCAC 2020 Conference Record Holder in 100Y Butterfly, a Kenyon College Pool Record Holder in 4X100Y Individual Medley Relay, Kenyon College Varsity Record in the 4X50Y Medley Relay, Kenyon College varsity Record in 50Y Butterfly, a Toyota US Open Championships 2022 Qualifier in 100m fly and 50m free and CSCAA Awardee in 2020, 2021,2022 and 2023.

The 2023 NCAA Men's Division III Swimming and Diving Championships was De Silva's first and only NCAA participation. Due to the pandemic in the year 2020—which stemmed from COVID-19—the previous NCAA championships was canceled. In his Junior year, he studied abroad. Further, in 2020, De Silva qualified for the 2020 NCAA Men's Division III Swimming and Diving Championships as a strong contender who already had his meters to yards converted time(at the time) faster than the NCAA DIII national record in the 100y butterfly and was the reigning NCAC champion going into NCAA's: however, the event was canceled 4 days prior to the meet.

=== 2023 NCAA Men's Division III Swimming and Diving Championships ===
De Silva became a 2XNCAA national champion and was bestowed 5XAll American titles at this competition. He competed in the 100y butterfly, 100y freestyle, and 50y freestyle where he swam best times in all of them going 46.95, 43,84, and 19.83 (and 19.33 off a relay start) seconds respectively. Notably, he missed qualifying for the A final in his 100 free and 50 free; thus, those times came from the B final with resultant 9th place finishes. These efforts helped Kenyon to a second place finish behind the back to back national champions, Emory University.

== Filmography ==
=== Lane 0 - The Lane of Dreams ===
De Silva was featured in a documentary entitled "Lane 0 - The Lane of Dreams" documenting him and his team member's preparation for the 2016 Rio Olympics. The director, Manuel Tera, describes the documentary as "A feature-length documentary about the struggle of a group of swimmers from developing nations trying to qualify for the Olympic Games for the first time. A story about pursuing your dreams and overcoming adversity." The Documentary was nominated at the sports film festival in Italy and earned the "Golden Paladin" award.

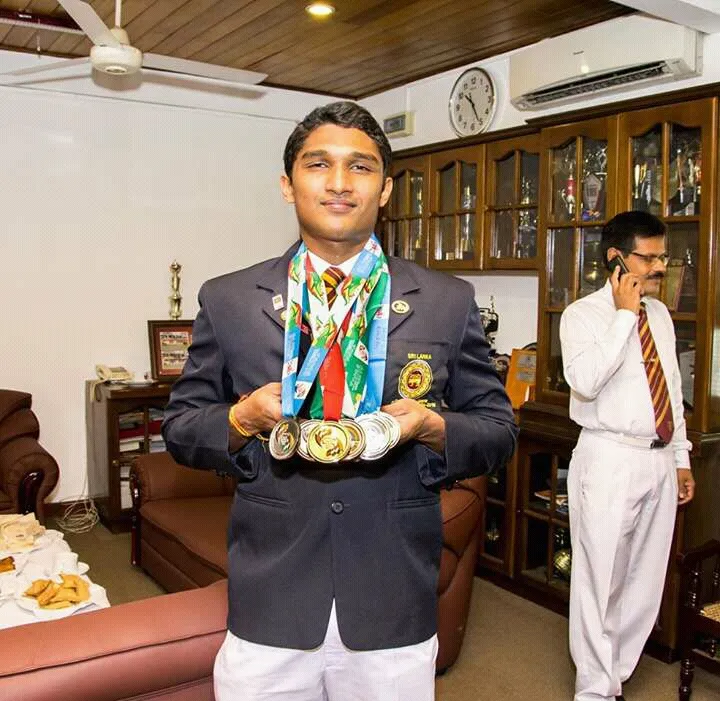
Cherantha De Silva with his 7Xmedals at the 2016 South Asian Games.

=== Storyline ===
"A group of swimmers from developing nations train at a state-of-the-art sports center in Thailand. Working for the first time with proper facilities and under the guidance of a renown coach, they are making progress and improving on their personal best each time. They have one year left in order to qualify for the Olympics. For most of them, it would be the first time somebody from their country gets through on their own merit. In a country full of inaccessible swimming pools, Shajan and Sajina are two Maldivian sisters who train in the sea. Nepalese Sofia can only swim during the summertime because there are no heated pools in the Himalayas. Eroi is a Rwandese boy who trains in a lake watching Internet videos. These are just some of the characters of Lane 0, a story about those unknown athletes who race in the side lanes and always finish last.They are currently participating in an experience that may have a significant impact on their future."

== Professional Swim Career ==
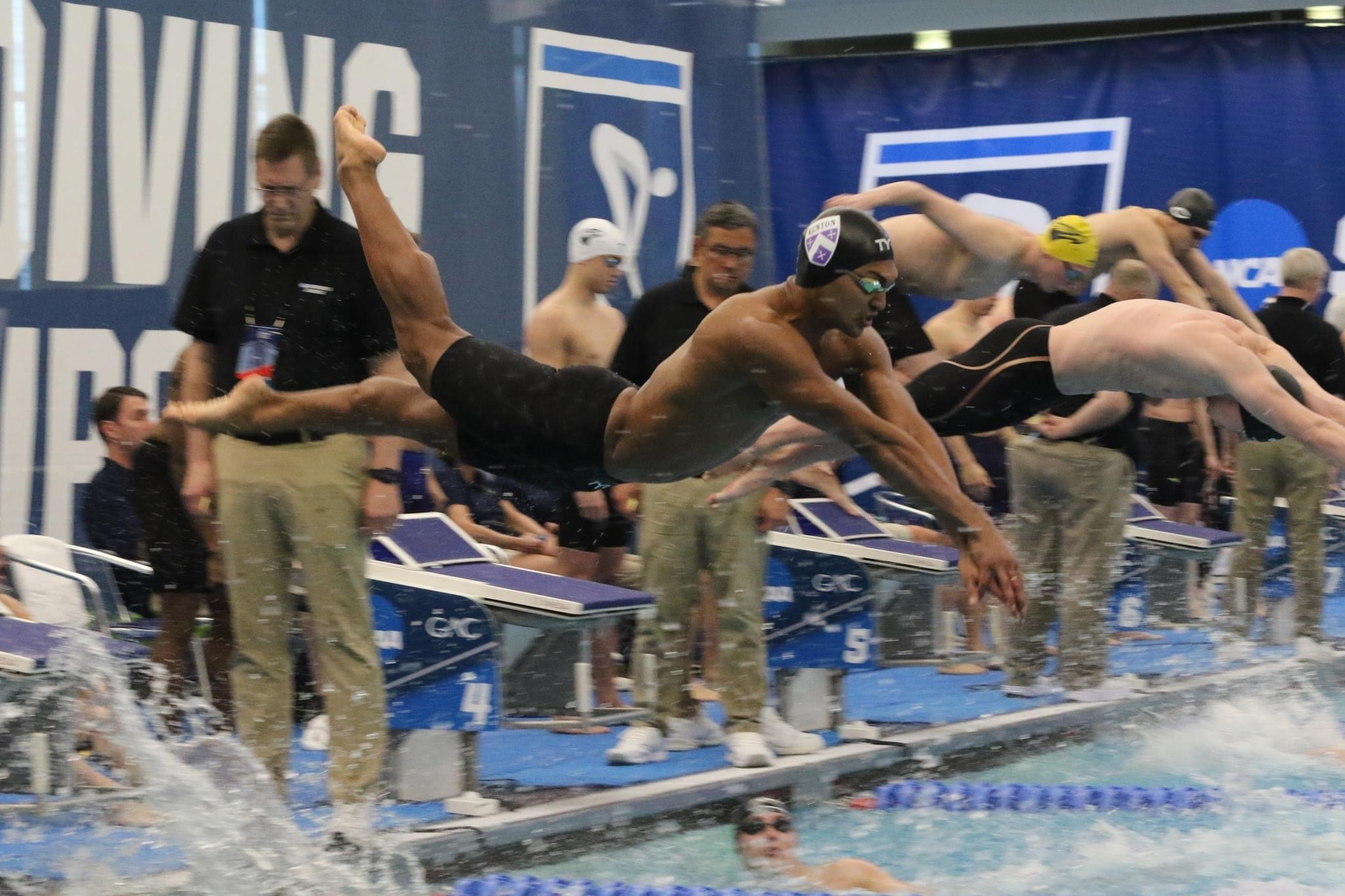
De Silva dives off for the relay at the USA, NCAA DIII Swimming championships 2023 clocking a time of 19.33 seconds

=== World Aquatics Championships ===
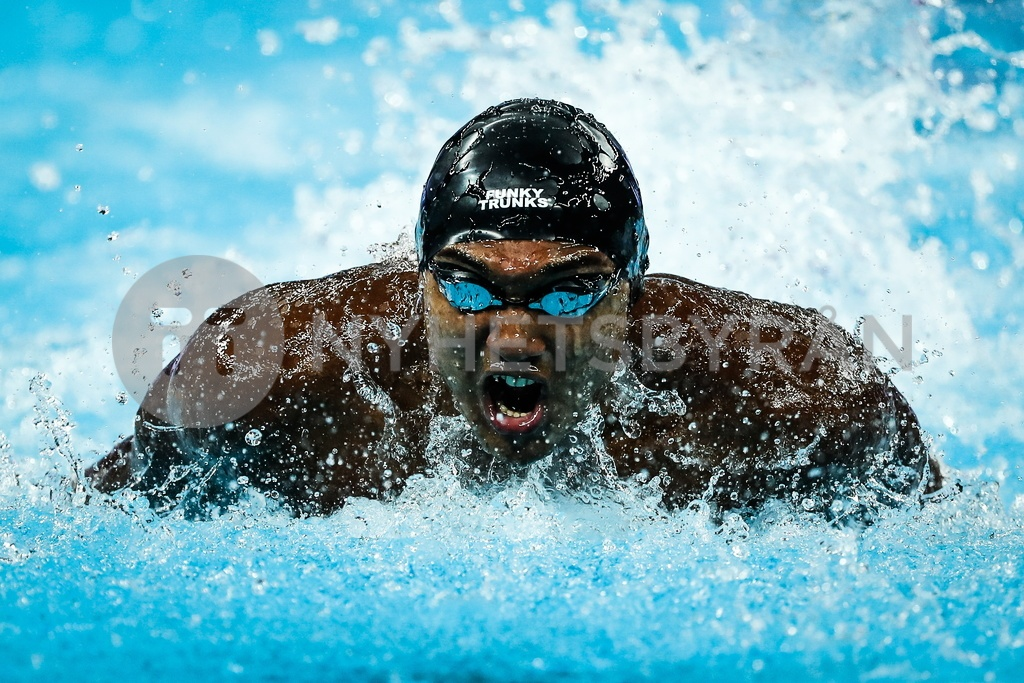
Cherantha De Silva competes at the 2016 FINA World Championships in Budapest, Hungary

==== 2013 4th FINA World Junior Swimming Championships-Dubai ====
De Silva participated in 2 events 50m Freestyle clocking 24.32 and 100 Butterfly clocking 57.79.

==== 2014 FINA World Swimming Championships (25 m)-Doha ====
De Silva subsequently competed in the 2014 FINA World Swimming Championships held in Doha, Qatar, where he swam in the heats of the Open 50m butterfly, Open 100m butterfly, Open 50m freestyle and Open 100m freestyle.

==== 2015 16th FINA World Championships-Kazan ====
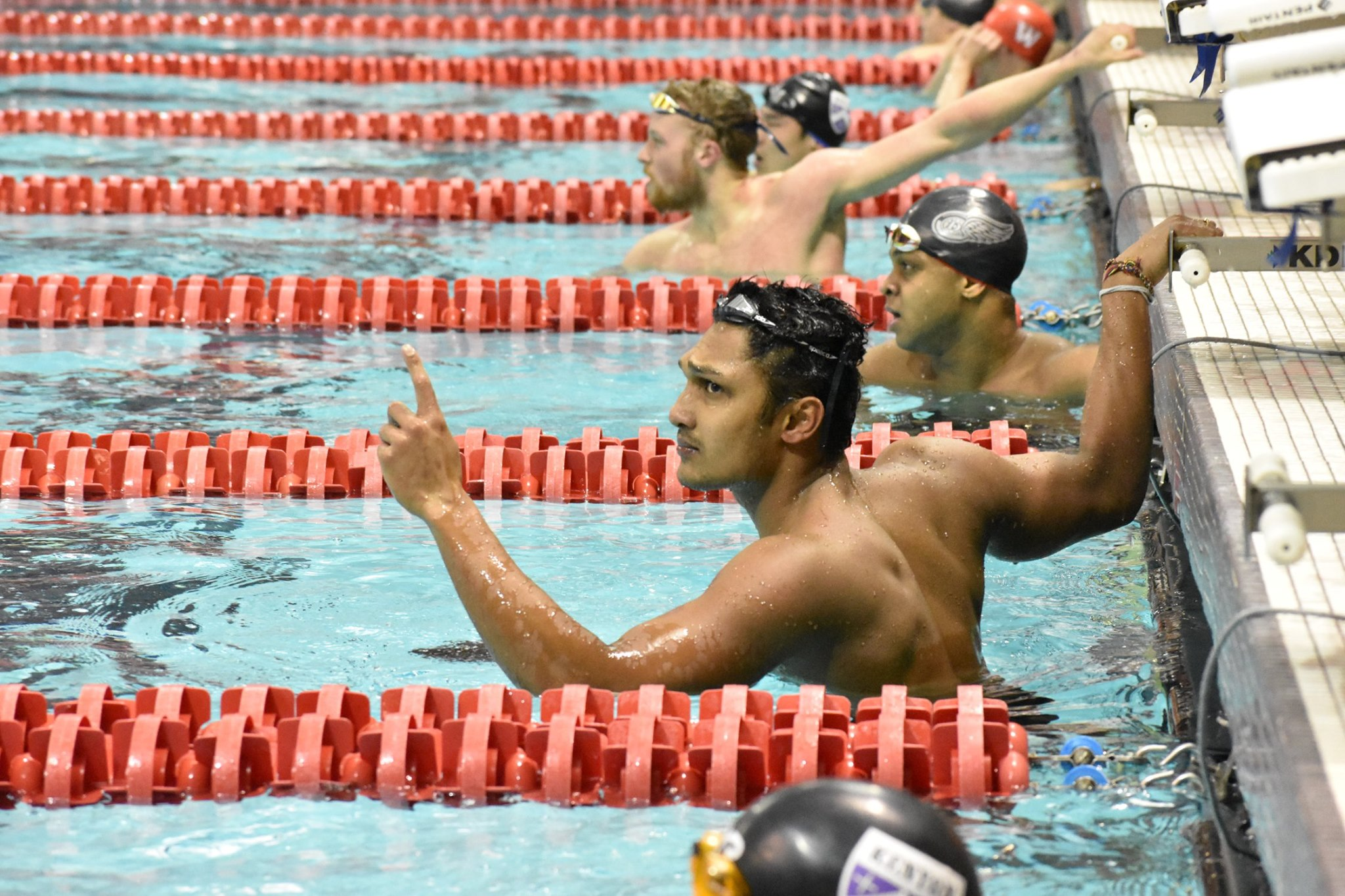
De Silva becomes the fastest swimmer in history of NCAC(USA) Conference Championships 2020 in the USA; shattering the Denison University Pool Record and NCAC Conference record as a freshman of Kenyon College

De Silva participated in the 2 men 2 women mixed relay team.

==== 2017 17th FINA World Championships-Budapest ====
Having been able to compete in the 50m Butterfly as well as the 100m Butterfly event he was able to secure a world ranking of 49 and 55 with a time of 25.15 and 55.09 respectively.

==== 2018 14th FINA World Swimming Championships (25 m)- Hangzhou ====
"Of the two men and two women swim team, Cherantha De Silva, Thimali Bandara and Savindi Jayaweera took the pool on the opening two days of the championship but had to hit the hay when they failed to advance to the semifinals amidst fierce competition."

==== 2021 FINA World Swimming Championships (25 m) - Yas Island, Abu Dhabi, UAE ====
De Silva competed in the 100m Butterfly and Freestyle representing Sri Lanka.

=== 2014 Commonwealth Games- Glassgow ===
De Silva participated at 2014 Commonwealth Games in Glasgow, competing in the 50m and 100m freestyle and the 50m and 100m butterfly but failed to progress past the heats.

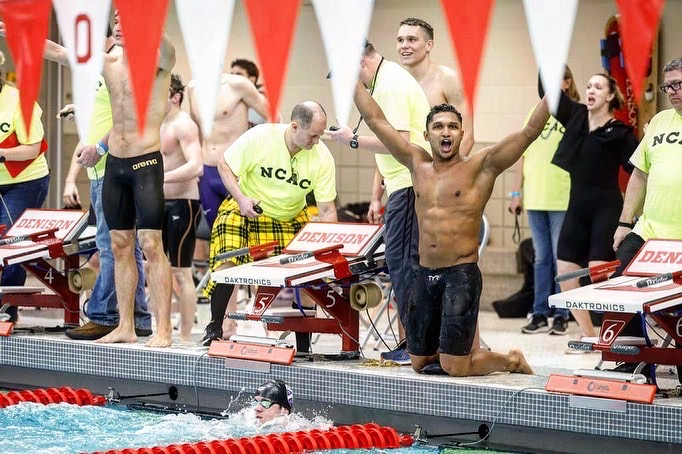
Cherantha De Silva celebrates a relay win at the 2023 NCAC(USA) Conference Championships

=== 2016 South Asian Games - Guwahati ===
In 2016 De Silva participated at the South Asian Games in Guwahati, India where he won one gold, four silver and two bronze medals.

=== 2017 7th National Short Course Swimming Championship- Singapore ===
In December 2017, De Silva was able to set history for Sri Lanka by breaking a foreign national record. De Silva was able to shatter Singapore Olympian Quah Wen Zeng's 50-m butterfly record, thus renewing it to 23.48 seconds. (He broke the Singapore national record and Sri Lankan national record, as well as set a new meet record in this race.) The specialty of De Silva's performance was that he was able to break 11 records across 10 events(heats and finals) in just two days. (record summary: Combination of heats, finals, and a meet record.)

=== 2018 Commonwealth Games- GoldCoast ===
In February 2018, de Silva was named to Sri Lanka's 2018 Commonwealth Games team. This was his 2nd representation of the Commonwealth Games edition. Cherantha was part of 4 × 100 m freestyle relay team that made history for Sri Lanka by advancing in to the finals. "The 4-man swim team representation in the Gold Coast, powered their way through to the final of the Men's 4 × 100 m Freestyle event earlier this morning." However, the team had met with an unexpected incident of disqualification which resulted in a great upset by the 4-man team.

=== 2018 Asian Games ===
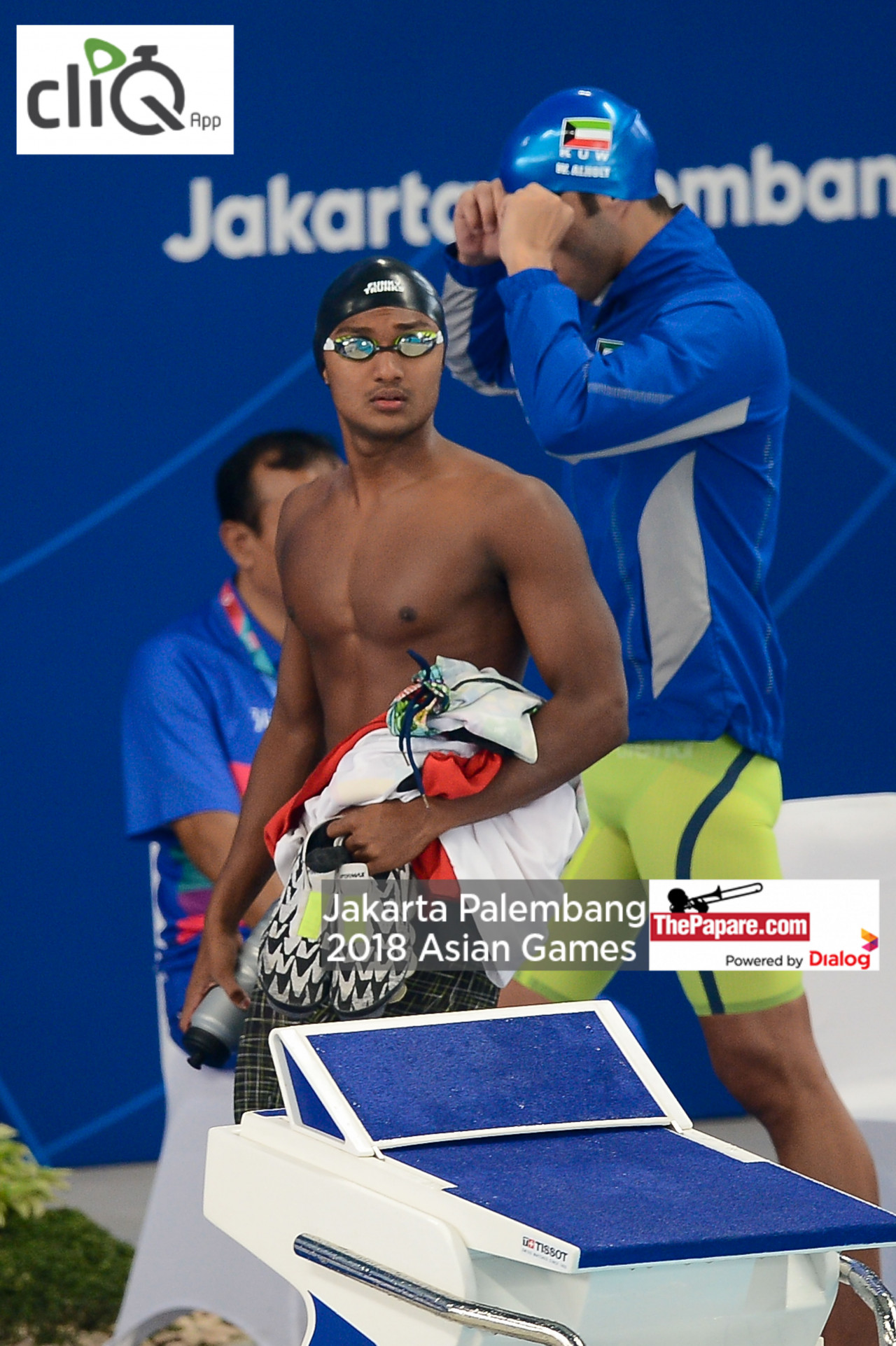
Cherantha De Silva at the 2018 Asian Games in Palembang.

Following the success of the 2018 Commonwealth Games, De Silva was selected for the 2018 Asian Games which was held in August.

== Scholarships ==
=== Sri Lankan Government Scholarship ===
In 2014 the former Sports Minister Mahindananda Aluthgamage sponsored De Silva to train at the Bolles School, Jacksonville, Florida.

=== FINA/Thanyapura Scholarship ===
De Silva was selected in 2015 by the Sri Lanka Aquatic Sports Union (SLASU) to receive the country's first FINA affiliated international training scholarship to train at the Thanyapura Aquatic Training Centre in Phuket, Thailand. His scholarship has been renewed for the next 4 years consecutively; in order 2015,2016,2017 and 2018. He was bestowed with the scholarships selected as the most deserving swimmer selected by the Sri Lanka Aquatic Sports Union(SLASU).

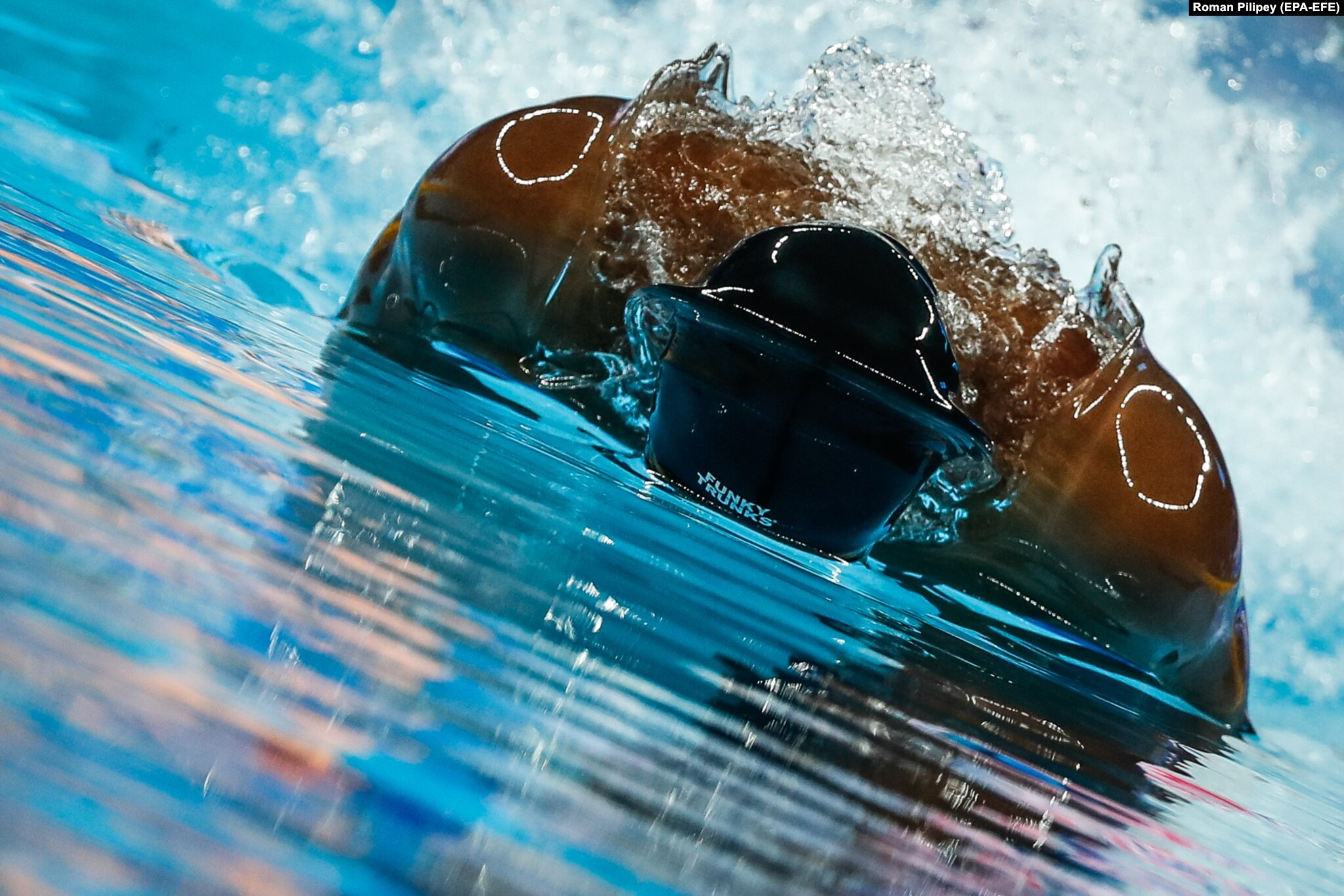
Cherantha De Silva competes at the 2016 FINA World Championships in Budapest, Hungary

== Sponsorships ==
De Silva had a full-fledged sponsorship from Australia's largest swim brand, Way Funky, under their Funky Trunks brand. This marked the first time in Sri Lankan history that a Sri Lankan swimmer had been sponsored by an international corporation. They sponsored him due to his impressive performance, image and likeness, providing support for all his swimming needs, including swim gear and swimwear.

De Silva was also the brand ambassador of Thanyapura Sports and Leisure Club Phuket in 2017.

== Post-Swimming Career ==
Upon retirement from his record breaking 23 year swimming journey, De Silva currently holds the Founding/Chairman position at CeyAnodes (Pvt) LTD. He is also a Director of his family owned business Kapla Motor Industries and now he uses his free time to write books about swimming as an elite along with his anecdotal experiences.

== Achievements ==
=== Sri Lankan National Records ===
Event	Time		Name	Club	Date	Meet	Location	Ref
50m Freestyle	22.55(SCM)	NAT, WC B	Cherantha De Silva	Sri Lanka	2 December 2017	7th Singapore National Short Course Swimming Championship 2017	Singapore, Singapore	
100m Freestyle	49.29(SCM)	NAT, WC B	Cherantha De Silva	Sri Lanka	2 December 2017	7th Singapore National Short Course Swimming Championship 2017	Singapore, Singapore	
50m Butterfly	23.48(SCM)	NAT, WC B	Cherantha De Silva	Sri Lanka	2 December 2017	7th Singapore National Short Course Swimming Championship 2017	Singapore, Singapore	
100m Butterfly	52.19(SCM)	NAT, WC B	Cherantha De Silva	Sri Lanka	1 December 2017	7th Singapore National Short Course Swimming Championship 2017	Singapore, Singapore	
200m Butterfly	1.57.99(SCM)	NAT, WC B	Cherantha De Silva	Sri Lanka	1 December 2017	7th Singapore National Short Course Swimming Championship 2017	Singapore, Singapore	
200m Butterfly	2.05.10(LCM)	NAT	Cherantha De Silva	Sri Lanka	10 March 2017	53rd Milo/Pram Malaysia Open Swimming Championship	Melaka, Malaysia	
100m Butterfly	54.44(LCM)	NAT	Cherantha De Silva	Sri Lanka	17 June 2017	13th Singapore National Championships (50m)	Singapore, Singapore	
4×100m freestyle relay	3:22.84(LCM)	NAT	Cherantha De Silva	Sri Lanka	06 April 2018	2018 Commonwealth Games	Gold Coast, Queensland, Australia	
4×100m Medley relay	3:58.11(LCM)	NAT	Cherantha De Silva	Sri Lanka	10 February 2016	South Asian Games	Guwahati, India	
Mixed 4×50m medley relay	1:52.58(SCM)	NAT	Cherantha De Silva	Sri Lanka	10 February 2016	2014 FINA World Swimming Championships (25 m)	Doha, Qatar	

=== International and Collegiate Level Records ===
Event	Time		Name	Club	Date	Meet	Location	Ref
100y Butterfly	47.31	NCAC Record, Pool Record	Cherantha De Silva	Kenyon College	14 February 2020	NCAC Conference Championships	Granville, OH, United States	
4X50Y Medley Relay	1.26.76	Varsity Record	Cherantha De Silva	Kenyon College	15 March 2023	NCAA Men's Division III Swimming and Diving Championships	Greensboro, NC, United States	
50scm Butterfly	23.48	Meet Record and unofficial Singaporean Record	Cherantha De Silva	Sri Lanka	01 December 2017	2017 Singapore Open Nationals – Short course meters	Singapore, Singapore	
50scm Freestyle	22.55	Meet Record	Cherantha De Silva	Sri Lanka	02 December 2017	2017 Singapore Open Nationals – Short course meters	Singapore, Singapore	
