= Machiko Raheem =

Sri Lankan swimmer (born 1996)

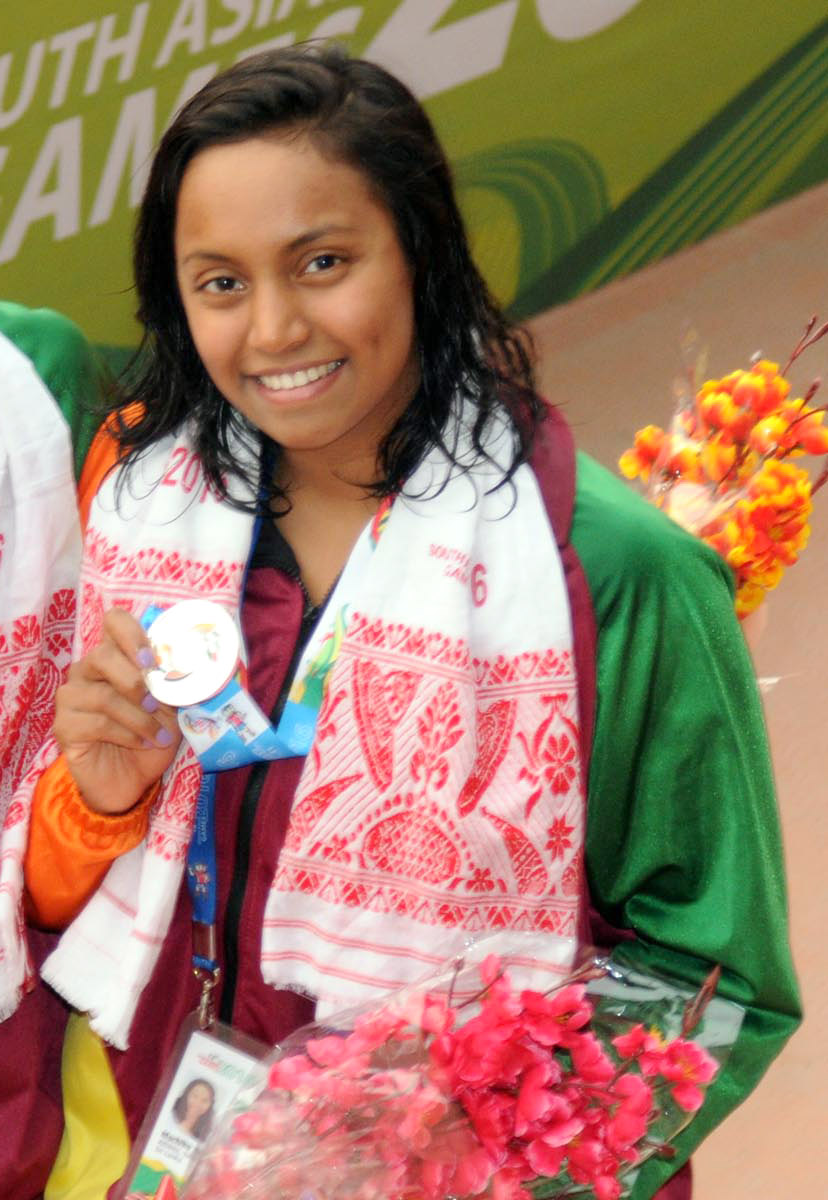
- Raheem at the 2016 South Asian Games

Personal information
- Born: January 13, 1996 (age 30)

Sport
- Sport: Swimming
Medal record
Swimming
Representing Sri Lanka
South Asian Games
Silver medal – second place	2016 Guwahati	50m freestyle
Silver medal – second place	2016 Guwahati	100m freestyle
Silver medal – second place	2016 Guwahati	200m freestyle
Silver medal – second place	2016 Guwahati	100m butterfly
Silver medal – second place	2016 Guwahati	4x100m freestyle relay
Silver medal – second place	2016 Guwahati	4x200m freestyle relay

Machiko Suharmee Raheem (born January 13, 1996) is a Sri Lankan medal-winning swimmer who has represented her country at international competitions. She represented Sri Lanka in the women's 50 m, 100 m and 200 m freestyle swimming events at the 2016 South Asian Games, winning a silver medal in the women's 200 m freestyle event.

Raheem has broken records many times in her swimming career. In 2007, she broke three records at the Pentathlon Swimming Championships (50 m back stroke, 50 m free style, and 200 m individual medley).

She set Sri Lankan national records for the 100 m, 200 m, and 400 m freestyle at the Sri Lankan National Aquatic Championships 2011. In the 2012 National Swimming Championship, she set three new national records and she beat the South Asian Games 200 m freestyle record, as well as being on the relay team that broke all five freestyle national records.

In 2014, she set another 200 m record at the Sri Lanka Schools Age Group Swimming Championship.

She attended high school at the Asian International School and was coached by Manoj Abeysinghe, before moving to Penn State.
