= Damini Gowda =

Indian swimmer

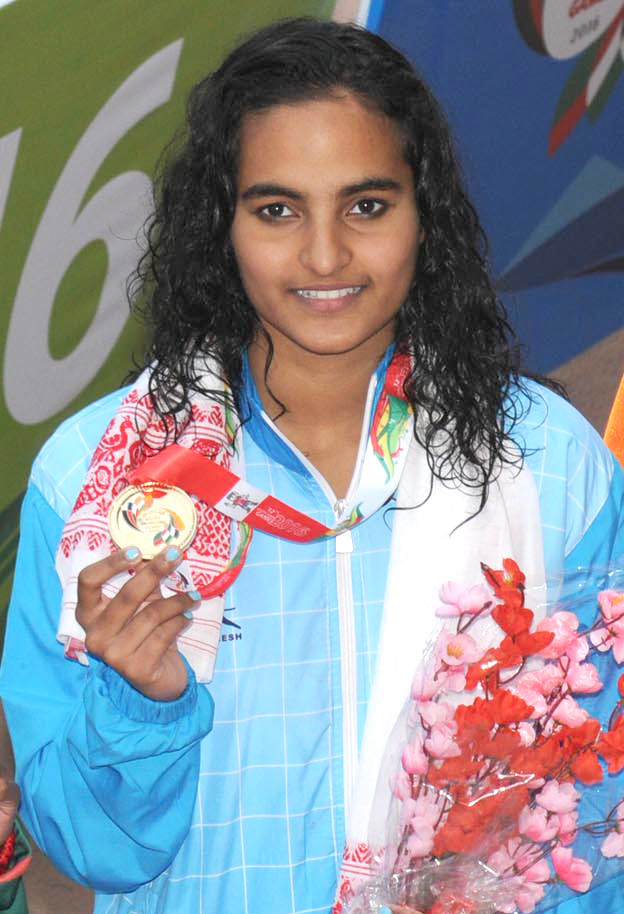
- Damini Gowda at the 12th South Asian Games, 2016

Personal information
- Born: 20 February 1999 (age 27)

Sport
- Sport: Swimming
Medal record
Representing India
South Asian Games
Gold medal – first place	2016 Guwahati	100m butterfly
Gold medal – first place	2016 Guwahati	200m butterfly
Gold medal – first place	2016 Guwahati	4x200m freestyle relay
Gold medal – first place	2016 Guwahati	4x100m medley relay

Damini Gowda (born 20 February 1999) is an Indian swimmer. She competed in the women's 100 metre butterfly event at the 2017 World Aquatics Championships. She also participated at the 2016 South Asian Games and won four gold medals.

Damini Gowda won the bronze medal in the 16th Gymnaside ISF World School Championships 2016 in Turkey. Damini's ultimate achievement was getting qualified for the Tokyo Olympics 2020.
