= Thanyapura Sports and Leisure Club Phuket =

Recreation facility in Phuket, Thailand

Coordinates: 8.0486°N 98.3530°E

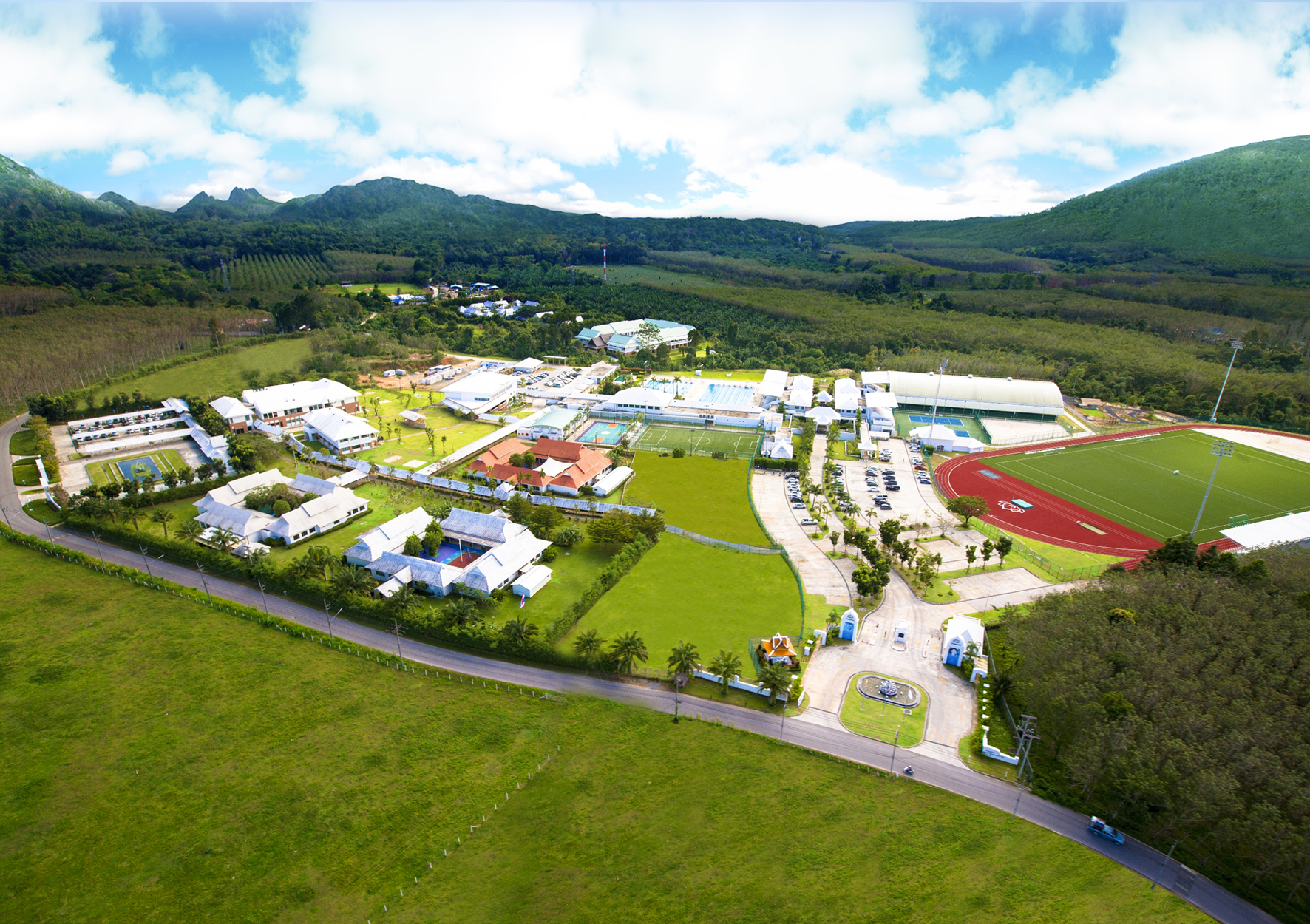
An aerial shot overlooking the facilities at Thanyapura Sports & Health Resort in Phuket, Thailand.

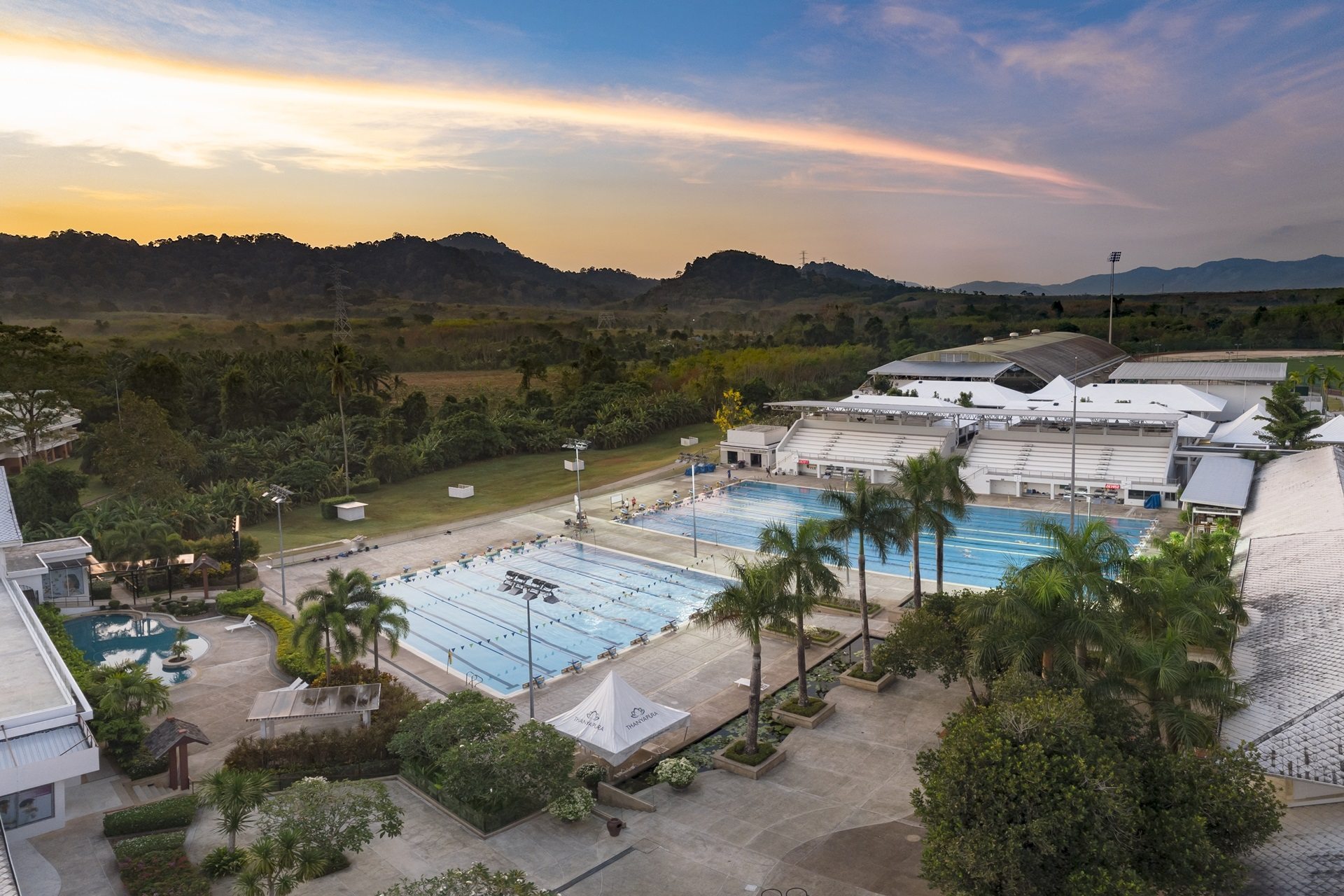
Thanyapura Sports and Leisure Club

Thanyapura Sports & Health Resort is a world-class wellness and athletic destination located in Phuket, Thailand. Established in 2012, the resort offers integrated programs in sports, health, fitness, and lifestyle, serving athletes, corporate groups, families, and wellness travelers. Its close proximity to several major international schools makes it a popular base for families considering relocation or long-stay education options in Phuket.

Location

Located in Thalang, Thanyapura is surrounded by protected national parkland and is only 15 minutes from Phuket International Airport. The resort’s natural, tranquil setting supports both high-performance training and personal wellness. It is also strategically positioned near several leading international schools in Phuket, making it ideal for educational visits and family relocation support.

Sports Facilities

Thanyapura is often recognized as having the best gym in Phuket, alongside elite training grounds that attract professional teams and national athletes.

Key sports and training facilities include:

- 50m Olympic-size pool and 25m training pool
- 6 tennis courts including 4 indoor courts and 2 outdoor courts
- 500m running track
- Power & Cardio gym
- High-performance training centre
- Muay Thai training ring
- Yoga, Pilates & spinning studios
- Sports science and performance diagnostics
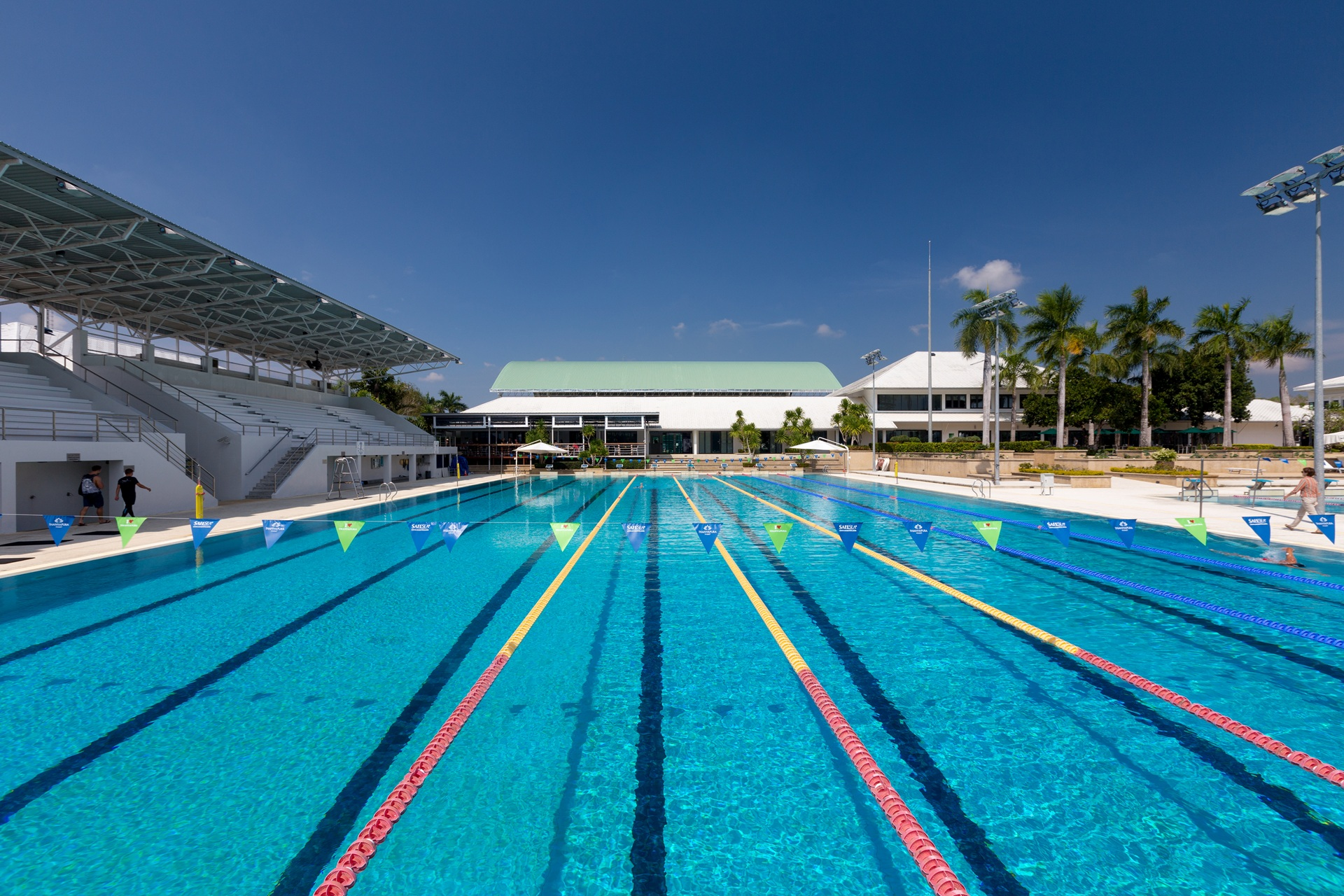
  50m Swimming Pool
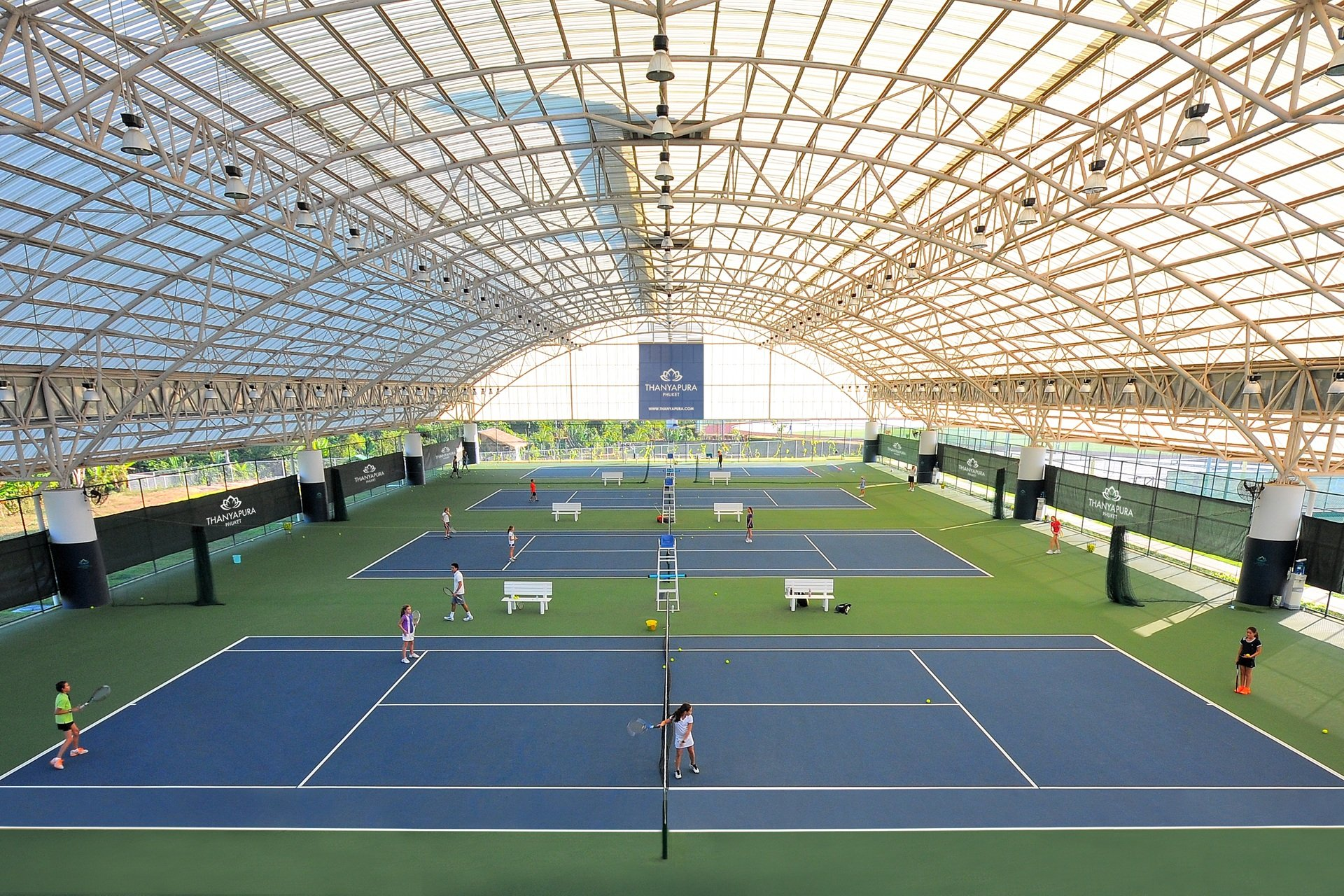
  Tennis Courts
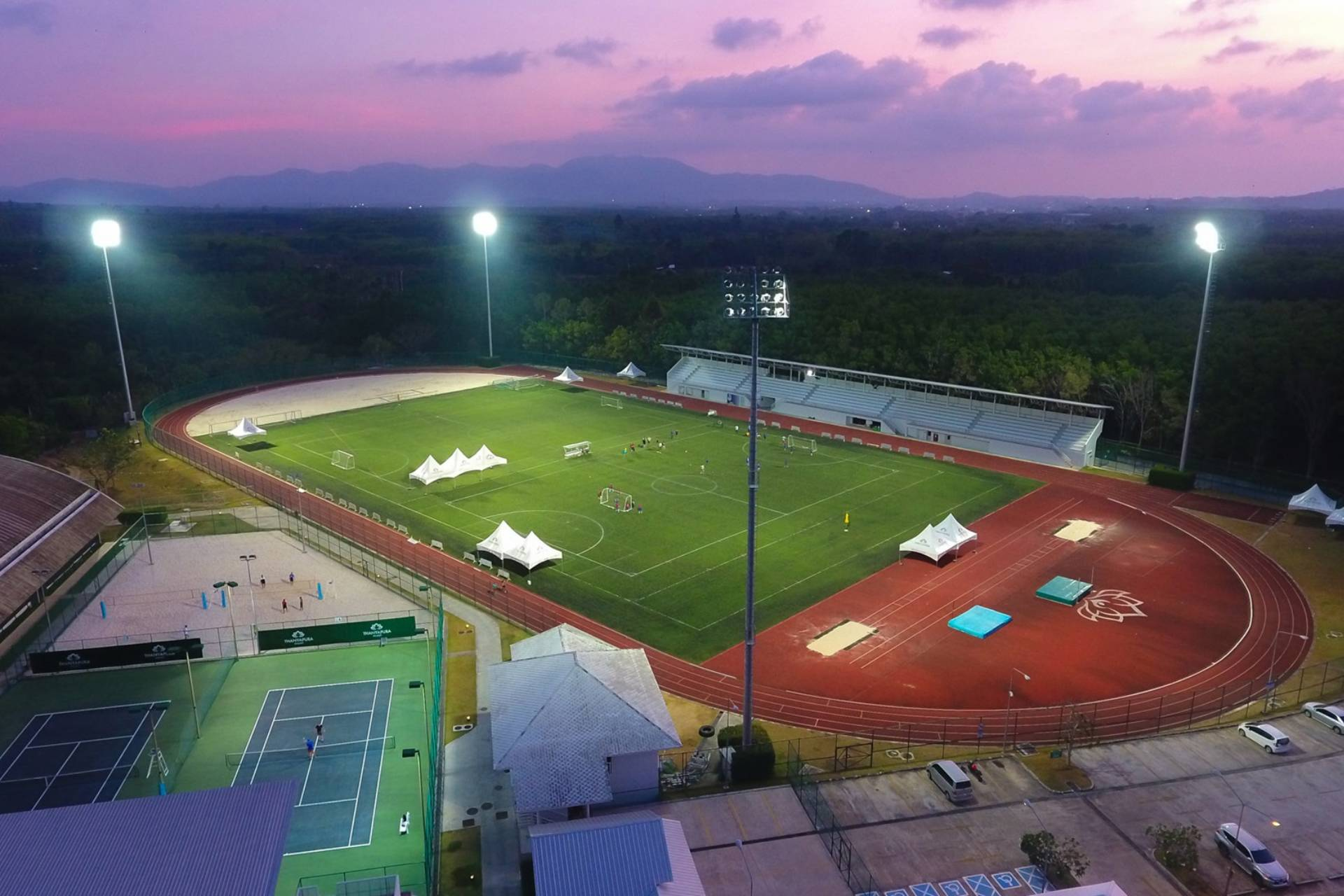
  500m running track & Rugby/Football field

== Health & Wellness ==
The resort’s Lifestyle Clinic offers a science-based approach to health, featuring:

- Functional medicine & preventive health assessments
- Weight loss & detox programs
- Hormonal balancing & IV therapy
- Physiotherapy & rehabilitation
- Nutrition coaching & mental well-being support

Thanyapura also offers a variety of wellness group classes such as yoga, aerial yoga, Pilates, Zumba, and active stretching.

== Family-Friendly Activities ==
Thanyapura is ideal for families, especially those visiting or relocating to Phuket for education. The resort offers:

- Future Star Kids Camp during school holidays (ages 4–8)
- Junior Development Program during term time for swim, tennis, triathlon, and Muay Thai
- Learn to Swim Program for beginners
- Junior Tennis Package with professional coaching
- Proximity to international schools like UWC Thailand, BISP, and HeadStart

== Corporate & Team Building ==
Thanyapura also serves the corporate travel and MICE market, offering:

- Customizable team building programs
- On-site meeting rooms and seminar spaces
- Full-board wellness menus and healthy catering
- Corporate wellness retreats and leadership development

== Accommodation ==
The resort offers 114 rooms across two wings:

- Garden Wing – Quiet and surrounded by nature, perfect for wellness and family guests
- Pool Wing – Active zone near sports facilities, ideal for athletes and teams

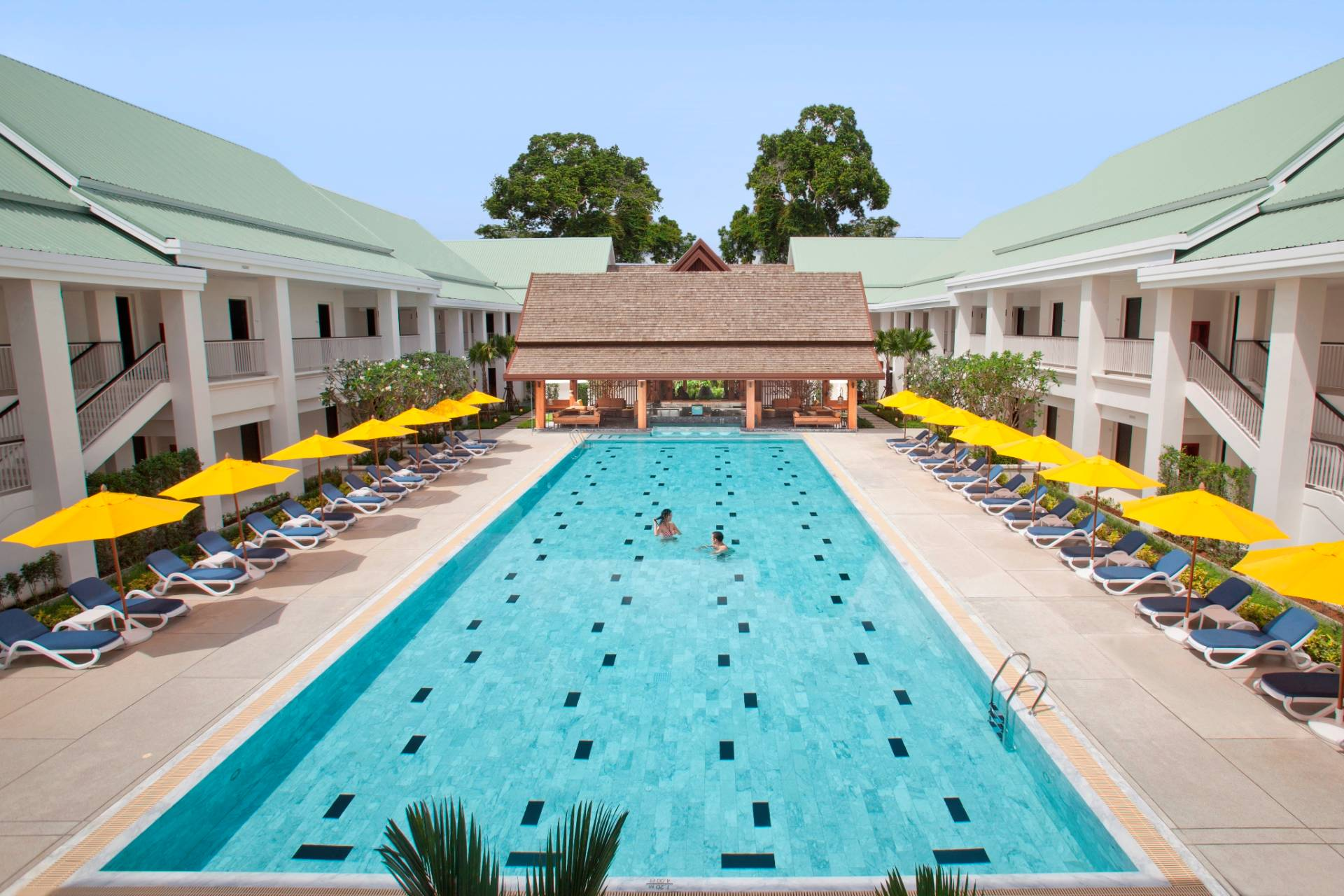
Hotel Pool

Rooms are equipped with eco-friendly amenities, high-speed Wi-Fi, and direct access to all resort facilities.

== Dining ==
Thanyapura features two main dining venues:

- DiVine Restaurant – Healthy, international cuisine with plant-based options and performance-focused menus
- Booster Bar – A casual spot for smoothies, energy bowls, and snacks

Guests can also customize half-board and full-board meal plans based on their wellness or training goals.

== Sustainability & Philosophy ==
Thanyapura emphasizes the connection between mind, body, and spirit, integrating movement, mindfulness, and nutrition across all programs. The resort promotes eco-friendly practices and plant-forward dining to support both health and the planet.

== Recognition ==
- Training base for Olympic athletes and national teams
- Regular partner of sports federations and international events
- Recognized among top wellness resorts in Southeast Asia

- Official Website: www.thanyapura-phuket.com
- Facebook: www.facebook.com/Thanyapuraphuketofficial
- Instagram: www.instagram.com/thanyapuraphuket
