= Swimming at the 2016 South Asian Games =

Swimming at the 2016 South Asian Games were held in Guwahati, India from 10 – 15 February 2016.

== Medalists ==
=== Men's events ===
Event	Gold		Silver		Bronze	
50 m freestyle	Mathew Abeysinghe; Sri Lanka	23.33 GR	Virdhawal Khade; India	23.54	Mahfizur Rahman; Bangladesh	23.95
100 m freestyle	Mathew Abeysinghe; Sri Lanka	51.23 GR	Cherantha de Silva; Sri Lanka	52.11	Mahfizur Rahman; Bangladesh	52.34
200 m freestyle	Mathew Abeysinghe; Sri Lanka	1:52.28 GR	Saurabh Sangvekar; India	1:53.03	Mahfizur Rahman; Bangladesh	1:56.19
400 m freestyle	Saurabh Sangvekar; India	3:58.84	Sajan Prakash; India	4:03.79	Kyle Abeysinghe; Sri Lanka	4:11.07
1500 m freestyle	Sajan Prakash; India	15:55.34	Saurabh Sangvekar; India	16:13.15	Mahfizur Rahman; Bangladesh	17:11.95
50 m backstroke	P.S Madhu; India	26.86	M Arvind; India	27.18	Matthew Abeysinghe; Sri Lanka	27.49
100 m backstroke	P.S Madhu; India	57.94	Sethu Manickavel; India	59.47	Syed Tariq; Pakistan	1:01.04
200 m backstroke	M Arvind; India	2:08.00	Kavindra Nugaweh; Sri Lanka	2:14.94	Naveed Hussain; Pakistan	2:19.57
50 m breastroke	Sandeep Sejwal; India	28.79	Puneet Rana; India	29.11	MD Shajahan Ali; Bangladesh	30.41
100 m breastroke	Sandeep Sejwal; India	1:03.14	Puneet Rana; India	1:03.80	Kiran Jasinghe; Sri Lanka	1:05.86
200 m breastroke	Sandeep Sejwal; India	2:20.66 GR	Kiran Jasinghe; Sri Lanka	2:26.17	MD Shariful Islam; Bangladesh	2:26.99
50 m butterfly	Virdhawal Khade; India	24.54	Anshul Kothari; India	25.24	Cherantha de Silva; Sri Lanka	25.45
100 m butterfly	Mathew Abeysinghe; Sri Lanka	55.42 GR	Supriyo Mondal; India	55.86	Cherantha de Silva; Sri Lanka	56.00
200 m butterfly	Sajan Prakash; India	2:03.02	Cherantha de Silva; Sri Lanka	2:11.10	MD Juwel Ahmed; Bangladesh	2:13.02
200 m individual medley	Mathew Abeysinghe; Sri Lanka	2:09.63 GR	Sanu Debnath; India	2:11.65	MD Juwel Ahmed; Bangladesh	2:15.05
400 m individual medley	Mathew Abeysinghe; Sri Lanka	4:40.47	Sanu Debnath; India	4:40.85	MD Juwel Ahmed; Bangladesh	4:52.50
4×100 m freestyle relay	Sri Lanka (SRI); Cherantha De Silva; Kyle Abeysinghe; Shehan De Silva; Mathew Abeysinghe	3:30.11 GR	India (IND); Neil Contractor; Nair Sharma; Sahil Chopra; Anshul Kothari	3:30.78	Bangladesh (BAN); Rafiqul Islam; MD Mahfizur; MD Anik Islam; MD Ashief Riza	3:39.72
4×200 m freestyle relay	India (IND); Neil Contractor; Raj Bhanwadia; Saurabh Sangvekar; Sajan Prakash	7:43.42	Sri Lanka (SRI); Cherantha de Silva; Kyle Abeysinghe; Shehan De Silva; Mathew Abeysinghe	7:58.99	Bangladesh (BAN); MD Juwel Ahmed; MD Mahfizur; MD Anik Islam; MD Ashief Riza	8:31.08
4×100 m medley relay	India (IND); PS Madhu; Sandeep Sejwal; Anshul Kothari; Supriyo Mondal	3:49.78	Sri Lanka (SRI); Cherantha de Silva; Kyle Abeysinghe; Kiran Jasinghe; Mathew Abeysinghe	3:58.11	Bangladesh (BAN); MD Juwel Ahmed; MD Mahfizur; MD Mahamudun; MD Kamal Hossain	4:01.03

=== Women's events ===
Event	Gold		Silver		Bronze	
50 m freestyle	Kimiko Raheem; Sri Lanka	26.49	Machiko Raheem; Sri Lanka	27.40	Maana Patel; India	27.44
100 m freestyle	Kimiko Raheem; Sri Lanka	57.20 GR	Machiko Raheem; Sri Lanka	59.64	Shivani Kataria; India	1:00.14
200 m freestyle	Shivani Kataria; India	2:08.68 GR	Machiko Raheem; Sri Lanka	2:09.02	Ishani Senanayake; Sri Lanka	2:11.63
400 m freestyle	V Malvika; India	4:30.08	Shivani Kataria; India	4:38.43	Gaurika Singh; Nepal	4:40.93
800 m freestyle	V Malvika; India	9:19.48	Ishani Senanayake; Sri Lanka	9:48.62	Aminath Shajan; Maldives	10:41.41
50 m backstroke	Kimiko Raheem; Sri Lanka	29.75	Maana Patel; India	30.06	Bisma Khan; Pakistan	31.95
100 m backstroke	Kimiko Raheem; Sri Lanka	1:03.78	Maana Patel; India	1:06.00	Gaurika Singh; Nepal	1:07.31
200 m backstroke	Kimiko Raheem; Sri Lanka	2:18.09 GR	Maana Patel; India	2:22.06	Gaurika Singh; Nepal	2:26.93
50 m breaststroke	Mahfuza Khatun; Bangladesh	34.88	Hasanthi Nugawela; Sri Lanka	35.69	Ramudi Samarakoon; Sri Lanka	35.99
100 m breaststroke	Mahfuza Khatun; Bangladesh	1:17.86	Lianna Swan; Pakistan	1:18.58	Chatat Arora; Bangladesh	1:18.77
200 m breaststroke	Lianna Swan; Pakistan	2:48.85	Hasanthi Nugawela; Sri Lanka	2:49.17	Romana Akter; Bangladesh	2:49.60
50 m butterfly	Jyotsna Pansare; India	29.19	Avantika Chavan; India	29.67	Hiruni Perera; Sri Lanka	30.21
100 m butterfly	Damini Gowda; India	1:04.92	Hiruni Perera; Sri Lanka	1:06.89	Machiko Raheem; Sri Lanka	1:07.24
200 m butterfly	Damini Gowda; India	2:21.12	Ridmi Rankothge; Sri Lanka	2:39.10	Sonia Aktar; Bangladesh	2:45.17
200 m individual medley	Shraddha Sudhir; India	2:31.18	Gaurika Singh; Nepal	2:33.26	Uthama Silva; Sri Lanka	2:40.07
400 m individual medley	Sayani Ghosh; India	5:14.51	Shraddha Sudhir; India	5:23.32	J U I Silva; Sri Lanka	5:44.20
4×100 m freestyle relay	India (IND); Avantika Chavan; V Malvika; Maana Patel; Shivani Kataria	4:01.95 GR	Sri Lanka (SRI); Machiko Raheem; Kimiko Raheem; Ishani Senanayake; Sandu Savindi	4:05.07	Pakistan (PAK); Kiran Khan; Bisma Khan; Areeba Shaikh; Lianna Swan	4:22.38
4×200 m freestyle relay	India (IND); Shraddha Sudhir; V Malvika; Damini Gowda; Shivani Kataria	8:55.98	Sri Lanka (SRI); Machiko Raheem; Himani Vithanage; Ishani Senanayake; Uthama Silva	9:26.47	Pakistan (PAK); Kiran Khan; Bisma Khan; Areeba Shaikh; Lianna Swan	9:48.04
4×100 m medley relay	India (IND); Damini Gowda; Chahat Arora; Maana Patel; Shivani Kataria	4:30.91	Pakistan (PAK); Kiran Khan; Bisma Khan; Areeba Shaikh; Lianna Swan	4:48.01	Bangladesh (BAN); Naima Akter; Sonia Aktar; Najma Khatun; Mahfuza Khatun	4:50.36

== Medal table ==
Rank	Nation	Gold	Silver	Bronze	Total
1	India (IND)	23	19	3	45
2	Sri Lanka (SRI)	12	16	11	39
3	Bangladesh (BAN)	2	0	15	17
4	Pakistan (PAK)	1	2	5	8
5	Nepal (NEP)	0	1	3	4
6	Maldives (MDV)	0	0	1	1
Totals (6 entries)		38	38	38	114
