= Taekwondo at the 2016 South Asian Games =

Taekwondo competition

Taekwondo at the 2016 South Asian Games were held in Guwahati, India from 10 to 15 February 2016.

== Medalists ==
Event	Gold	Silver	Bronze
Men			
Women			

== Medal table ==
Rank	Nation	Gold	Silver	Bronze	Total
1	Afghanistan (AFG)	6	1	1	8
2	India (IND)	5	3	2	10
3	Pakistan (PAK)	2	1	4	7
4	Nepal (NEP)	0	7	3	10
5	Sri Lanka (SRI)	0	1	4	5
6	Bhutan (BHU)	0	0	9	9
7	Bangladesh (BAN)	0	0	3	3
Totals (7 entries)		13	13	26	52
