= Boxing at the 2016 South Asian Games =

Boxing at the 2016 South Asian Games were held in Guwahati, India from 10 – 15 February 2016.

== Medalists ==
Event	Gold	Silver	Bronze
Men			
Women			

== Medal table ==
Rank	Nation	Gold	Silver	Bronze	Total
1	India (IND)	10	0	0	10
2	Sri Lanka (SRI)	0	5	4	9
3	Pakistan (PAK)	0	4	2	6
4	Afghanistan (AFG)	0	1	5	6
5	Bangladesh (BAN)	0	0	4	4
6	Nepal (NEP)	0	0	3	3
7	Bhutan (BHU)	0	0	2	2
Totals (7 entries)		10	10	20	40

== Final standing ==
=== Men ===
Rank	Team	Pld	W	D	L
1st place, gold medalist(s)	Afghanistan (AFG)	0	0	0	0
2nd place, silver medalist(s)	Bangladesh (BAN)	0	0	0	0
3rd place, bronze medalist(s)	Bhutan (BHU)	0	0	0	0
4	India (IND)	0	0	0	0
5	Maldives (MDV)	0	0	0	0
6	Nepal (NEP)	0	0	0	0
7	Pakistan (PAK)	0	0	0	0
8	Sri Lanka (SRI)	0	0	0	0

=== Women ===
Rank	Team	Pld	W	D	L
1st place, gold medalist(s)	Afghanistan (AFG)	0	0	0	0
2nd place, silver medalist(s)	Bangladesh (BAN)	0	0	0	0
3rd place, bronze medalist(s)	Bhutan (BHU)	0	0	0	0
4	India (IND)	0	0	0	0
5	Maldives (MDV)	0	0	0	0
6	Nepal (NEP)	0	0	0	0
7	Pakistan (PAK)	0	0	0	0
8	Sri Lanka (SRI)	0	0	0	0
