= Kho kho at the 2016 South Asian Games =

Kho-Kho at the 2016 South Asian Games
- Venue: Indira Gandhi Athletic Stadium
- Dates: 10–15 February 2016

Kho kho at the 2016 South Asian Games were held in Guwahati, India from 10 – 15 February 2016.

== Medalists ==
Event	Gold	Silver	Bronze
Men	India (IND)	Bangladesh (BAN)	Nepal (NEP)
Women	India (IND)	Bangladesh (BAN)	Nepal (NEP)

== Medal table ==
Rank	Nation	Gold	Silver	Bronze	Total
1	India (IND)	2	0	0	2
2	Bangladesh (BAN)	0	2	0	2
3	Nepal (NEP)	0	0	2	2
Totals (3 entries)		2	2	2	6
