= Football at the 2016 South Asian Games =

- Venue: Guwahati & Shillong
- Dates: 5–16 February
- Nations: 7

Medalists
gold medal	Nepal (men); India (women)
silver medal	India (men); Nepal (women)
bronze medal	Bangladesh (men); Bangladesh (women)

Football is one of the events at the 2016 South Asian Games. It is the second edition to introduce Women's football to the Games, alongside Men's.

== Medalists ==
Event	Gold	Silver	Bronze
Men's tournament	Nepal	India	Bangladesh
Women's tournament	India	Nepal	Bangladesh

== Medal table ==
Rank	Nation	Gold	Silver	Bronze	Total
1	India (IND)	1	1	0	2
1	Nepal (NEP)	1	1	0	2
3	Bangladesh (BAN)	0	0	2	2
Totals (3 entries)		2	2	2	6

Source : South Asian Games 2016
