= Triathlon at the 2016 South Asian Games =

- Dates: 13–14 February

Triathlon at the 2016 South Asian Games were held in Guwahati, India from 13 – 14 February 2016.

The sport made its South Asian Games debut.

== Medalists ==
Event	Gold	Silver	Bronze
Men	Dilip Kumar; India	Gurudatt Gharat; India	Nuwan Kumara; Sri Lanka
Women	Pallavi Reiwala; India	Pooa Chaurushi; India	Roja K.c. Nepal
Mixed relay	India (IND); Pallavi Reiwala; Dilip Kumar; Sorojini Thoudam; Dihraj Sawant	Nepal (NEP); Yam Kumari Ghale; Himal Tamata; Roja K.c. Rudra Katuwal	Sri Lanka (SRI); Gayani Dasanayake; Lakruwan Dewa; Dinusha De Silva; Nuwan Kumara

== Medal table ==
Rank	Nation	Gold	Silver	Bronze	Total
1	India (IND)	3	2	0	5
2	Nepal (NEP)	0	1	1	2
3	Sri Lanka (SRI)	0	0	2	2
Totals (3 entries)		3	3	3	9
