= 2016 South Asian Games =

Multi-sport event

XII South Asian Games
- Host city: Guwahati and Shillong
- Country: India
- Motto: Play for Peace, Progress and Prosperity
- Nations: 8
- Athletes: 2,672
- Events: 226 in 22 sports
- Opening: 5 February (Guwahati); 6 February (Shillong)
- Closing: 16 February
- Opened by: Narendra Modi; Prime Minister of India
- Closed by: Sarbananda Sonowal
- Main venue: Indira Gandhi Athletic Stadium, Guwahati; Jawaharlal Nehru Stadium, Shillong
- Website: Website

Summer

Winter

The 2016 South Asian Games, officially the XII South Asian Games, is a major multi-sport event which took place from 5 February to 16 February 2016 in Guwahati and Shillong, India. A total of 2,672 athletes competed in 226 events over 22 sports. Indian Prime Minister Narendra Modi inaugurated the 2016 South Asian Games in Guwahati on 5 February 2016. India continued its dominance in the game's medal tally with a staggering 308 medals including 188 gold medals.

== Host selection ==
The games were originally scheduled to be held in 2012 in Kathmandu, but were postponed to Delhi for 2013 but again, were postponed to late 2015 because of the suspension of the Indian Olympic Association. In 2015 it was decided to further postpone the competition to early 2016, because participating countries felt the December dates did not present enough time for preparation.

== Logo, Mascot and Anthem ==
=== The Mascot ===
Tikhor, the official mascot used for the games.

On 19 December 2015, Tikhor the baby Indian Rhino was unveiled to the public as the official mascot for the 2016 South Asian Games. According to the organising committee, Tikhor carries the message of Peace, Progress, and Prosperity in the South Asian region. This is in line with the official motto, "Play for Peace, Progress and Prosperity".

=== The Anthem ===
The anthem of the games was chosen to be a famous Assamese song, "Ei Prithibi Ek Krirangan" (The world is a playground) by Bhupen Hazarika, an Indian lyricist, musician, singer, poet and film-maker from Assam.

== The Games ==
=== Sports ===
There are 228 events in 23 sports scheduled to be held. A total of 764 medals (228 gold, 228 silver and 308 bronze medals) are on offer in 2016 South Asian Games.

- Archery
- Athletics
- Badminton
- Boxing
- Cycling
- Field hockey
- Football
- Handball
- Judo
- Kabaddi
- Kho kho
- Shooting
- Squash
- Swimming
- Table tennis
- Taekwondo
- Tennis
- Triathlon
- Volleyball
- Weightlifting
- Wrestling
- Wushu

== Participating nations ==
8 countries competed in 2016 South Asian Games.

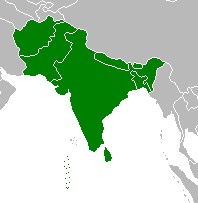
Participating nations

- Afghanistan (254 athletes)
- Bangladesh (409)
- Bhutan (87)
- India (519)
- Maldives (184)
- Nepal (398)
- Pakistan (337)
- Sri Lanka (484)
Location of events in 2016 South Asian Games in India

== Medal tally ==
After Doping Test Result. * Host nation (India)

Rank	Nation	Gold	Silver	Bronze	Total
1	India*	188	92	28	308
2	Sri Lanka	25	64	98	187
3	Pakistan	12	35	57	104
4	Afghanistan	7	9	19	35
5	Bangladesh	4	16	55	75
6	Nepal	3	23	35	61
7	Maldives	0	2	1	3
8	Bhutan	0	1	15	16
Totals (8 entries)		239	242	308	789

== Calendar ==
Competition scheduled accurate as of 5 February 2016.

OC	Opening ceremony	●	Event competitions	1	Event finals	CC	Closing ceremony

February 2016	5th Fri	6th Sat	7th Sun	8th Mon	9th Tue	10th Wed	11th Thu	12th Fri	13th Sat	14th Sun	15th Mon	16th Tue	Gold medals
Archery	●	●	●	4	4								8
Athletics					10	13	12	2					37
Badminton		●	2	●	●	5							7
Boxing									1	●	●		0
Cycling		2	2	2	2								8
Field hockey			●	●	●	●	1	1					2
Football	●	●	●	●	●	●	●	●	●		2		2
Handball						●	●	●	●	●	2		2
Judo											6	6	12
Kabaddi							●	●	●	●	2		2
Kho-Kho		●	●	●	2								2
Shooting						2	3	2	3	1	2		13
Squash		●	●	2	●	2							4
Swimming		8	7	7	8	8							38
Table tennis		●	2	●	1	4							7
Taekwondo									4	5	4		13
Tennis			●	●	●	3	2						5
Triathlon									2	1			3
Volleyball	●	●	●	●	2								2
Weightlifting		4	4	4	2								0
Wrestling		5	5	6									16
Wushu		1	2	3	4	5							0
Ceremonies	OC	OC										CC	
Total gold medals	0	0	0	0	0	0	0	0	0	0	0	0	0
Cumulative Total	0	0	0	0	0	0	0	0	0	0	0	0	0
February 2016	5th Fri	6th Sat	7th Sun	8th Mon	9th Tue	10th Wed	11th Thu	12th Fri	13th Sat	14th Sun	15th Mon	16th Tue	Gold medals

== Controversy ==
=== IOA ban and delay ===
Initially, the Games were expected to be held in October, 2012. However, during the General Body meeting of the Indian Olympic Association (IOA) on 16 December 2011, it was decided to postpone the Games to February, 2013. The primary concern highlighted was that the original plan meant that the Games would be held only two months after the 2012 Summer Olympics, a fact which made athletes uncomfortable. In addition, the Delhi Government had stated that "accommodation would be a problem during October–November". In April 2012, the IOA sent letters to all the National Olympic Committees (NOCs) of South Asia, announcing that the Games will be held for eight days beginning from 13 February 2013; further discussions would take place at an all-NOC meeting in Moscow. President of the Nepal Olympic Committee Dhruba Bahadur Pradhan also reported about the proposed additions of fencing, equestrian, gymnastics and the triathlon to the Games schedule. As of January 2013, host city and dates of the games were not yet confirmed.

The International Olympic Committee banned the Indian Committee in March for political interference (the national government played a role in Olympic officials' selection). This delayed the event further as the ban was only lifted in May and the possibility of a low-cost edition of the games was raised among ongoing hosting discussions and poor relations with neighboring Pakistan due to the 2013 India–Pakistan border incidents.

Two years later, on 11 February 2014, the International Olympic Committee decided to lift the ban. Up until now, the Indian side competed in Olympic events such as the Winter Olympic Games as independent participants.

A year later, on 5 June 2015, the uncertainty over the venue to host the 12th South Asian Games ended with the Sports Ministry and Indian Olympic Association deciding to hold the regional multi-sporting event in Guwahati and Shillong in November–December 2015. However, this was postponed even further to a tentative date of February 2016.

ULFA anti-talks faction also pledged support to South Asian Games, which is opposite to its stand on 2007 National Games of India held in Guwahati.

On 3 February 2016, International Basketball Federation (FIBA) stated that it will not recognise the competition because of "unacceptable interference by Indian Olympic Association in affairs of the Basketball Federation of India".

Pakistani women's volleyball team is returning to South Asian Games after two decades - for the first time after their participation in 1995 South Asian Games, Madras where they had finished with a bronze medal. Afghanistan and Pakistan basketball teams will not participate. Union Home ministry had sanctioned ₹60 crore (US$6.2 million) to the police authorities to upgrade their security apparatus for the South Asian Games.

India granted special concession to Pakistani athletes taking part in the 12th South Asian Games by declaring Guwahati and Kolkata as designated entry points for them.

=== Further political interference ===
Initially, the Basketball event was scheduled to take place in 11 February, however FIBA, Basketball's world governing body, decided to de-recognise the tournament on the grounds of political interference from the Indian Government and the Indian Olympic Association. This resulted in the entire event being cancelled, so rather having 228 events in 23 sports, the competition change to 226 events in 22 sports causing further scrutiny over the organization of the games.

== Doping at the 2016 South Asian Games ==
On February 7, 2016 after completion of squash event, Nasir Iqbal was asked to give his sample by World Anti Doping Agency (WADA). First Sample was tested positive and later after 3 days another test got the result as negative. Although he challenged, after significant evaluation WADA decided to dismiss his appeal and banned him for 4 years, from February 19, 2016, to February 19, 2020.

Nasir Iqbal was also stripped off from the Squash Men's Singles Gold-medalist Title.

Name	NOC	Sport	Stripped Off Medal	Awarded
Nasir Iqbal	Pakistan	Squash (Men's Singles)	(gold) Gold	(Pakistan) Farhan Zaman

== See also ==
- 2010 South Asian Games
