= Nicaragua at the 2025 World Aquatics Championships =

- Flag of Nicaragua
- World Aquatics code: NCA
- National federation: Federación de Natación de Nicaragua

in Singapore
- Competitors: 2 in 1 sport
- Medals: Gold 0 Silver 0 Bronze 0 Total 0

World Aquatics Championships appearances
- 1973; 1975; 1978; 1982; 1986; 1991; 1994; 1998; 2001; 2003; 2005; 2007; 2009; 2011; 2013; 2015; 2017; 2019; 2022; 2023; 2024; 2025

Nicaragua is competing at the 2025 World Aquatics Championships in Singapore from 11 July to 3 August 2025.

== Competitors ==
The following is the list of competitors in the Championships.

Sport	Men	Women	Total
Swimming	1	1	2
Total	1	1	2

== Swimming ==
Men

Athlete	Event	Heat		Semifinal		Final	
Athlete	Event	Time	Rank	Time	Rank	Time	Rank
Erick Blandon	50 m freestyle	23.57 NR	62	Did not advance			
Erick Blandon	100 m freestyle	53.01	72	Did not advance			

Women

Athlete	Event	Heat		Semifinal		Final	
Athlete	Event	Time	Rank	Time	Rank	Time	Rank
María Schutzmeier	50 m butterfly	28.29	49	Did not advance			
María Schutzmeier	100 m butterfly	1:03.45	44	Did not advance			
