= Nepal at the 2025 World Aquatics Championships =

- Flag of Nepal
- World Aquatics code: NEP
- National federation: Nepal Swimming Association

in Singapore
- Competitors: 4 in 1 sport
- Medals: Gold 0 Silver 0 Bronze 0 Total 0

World Aquatics Championships appearances
- 1973; 1975; 1978; 1982; 1986; 1991; 1994; 1998; 2001; 2003; 2005; 2007; 2009; 2011; 2013; 2015; 2017; 2019; 2022; 2023; 2024; 2025

Nepal competed at the 2025 World Aquatics Championships in Singapore from 11 July to 3 August 2025. There were four competitors.

== Competitors ==
The following is the list of competitors in the Championships.

Sport	Men	Women	Total
Swimming	2	2	4
Total	2	2	4

== Swimming ==
Men

Athlete	Event	Heat		Semifinal		Final	
Athlete	Event	Time	Rank	Time	Rank	Time	Rank
Ervin Shrestha	100 m freestyle	54.81	85	Did not advance			
Ervin Shrestha	200 m freestyle	2:02.83	57	Did not advance			
Ajal Tamrakar	50 m freestyle	25.16	87	Did not advance			
Ajal Tamrakar	50 m butterfly	26.49	77	Did not advance			

Women

Athlete	Event	Heat		Semifinal		Final	
Athlete	Event	Time	Rank	Time	Rank	Time	Rank
Duana Lama	200 m freestyle	2:13.40	44	Did not advance			
Duana Lama	100 m breaststroke	1:17.71	55	Did not advance			
Aarya Maharjan	50 m freestyle	30.07	84	Did not advance			
Aarya Maharjan	100 m freestyle	1:05.43	75	Did not advance			
