= Nepal Swimming Association =

Sports governing body in Nepal

- Sport: Aquatic sports
- Category: Swimming, masters swimming, synchronized swimming, diving, high diving, and water polo
- Jurisdiction: National
- Abbreviation: NSA
- Affiliation: FINA
- Regional affiliation: Asia Swimming Federation
- President: Ashok Bajracharya
- Secretary: Jagat Man Shrestha

Official website
- swimnepal.com
- (Nepal)

The Nepal Swimming Association (NSA) is the national governing body for aquatic sports in Nepal. Legally, it is a non-profit association registered under National Sports Council (Nepal) The federation holds elections for its office bearers every five years.The NSA currently oversees competition in the sports of swimming, masters swimming, synchronized swimming, diving, high diving, and water polo. It is affiliated to FINA, and the Asia Swimming Federation (AASF).

The NSA organizes various competitions annually, with the Nepal Aquatics Championship standing as the premier aquatic event in Nepal.

== Affiliated bodies ==
As of 2024, the affiliated members of the Nepal Swimming Association include the

1. Koshi Province Swimming Association,
2. Madhesh Province Swimming Association,
3. Bagmati Aquatics,
4. Lumbini Province Swimming Association,
5. Karnali Province Swimming Association, and
6. Sudurpashchim Province Swimming Association

Each of these organizations has hundreds of affiliated athletes across the nation

== See also ==
- List of Nepalese records in swimming
- Water polo in Nepal
- Swimming in Nepal
- Alexander Shah
- Sirish Gurung
- Gaurika Singh
- Sofia Shah
- Tisa Shakya
