= List of Nepalese records in swimming =

The Nepalese records in swimming are the fastest ever performances of swimmers from Nepal, which are recognised and ratified by the Nepal Swimming Association (NSA).

All records were set in finals unless noted otherwise.

== Long Course (50 m) ==
=== Men ===
Event	Time		Name	Club	Date	Meet	Location	Ref
50 m freestyle	23.79		Alexander Shah	-	June 2023	11th NSA Swimming Competition	Kathmandu, Nepal	
50 m freestyle	23.79	not ratified	Alexander Shah	Nepal	16 February 2024	World Championships	Doha, Qatar	
100 m freestyle	51.91	h	Alexander Shah	Nepal	30 July 2024	Olympic Games	Paris, France	
200 m freestyle	1:56.39	h	Nasir Hussain	Nepal	12 February 2024	World Championships	Doha, Qatar	
400 m freestyle	4:05.65 (Note: by official result source; 4:06.65 by NSA source, a typo)	h	Nasir Hussain	Nepal	11 February 2024	World Championships	Doha, Qatar	
800 m freestyle	9:12.62		Kalkin Shrestha	Nepal	1 October 2025	Asian Championships	Ahmedabad, India	
1500 m freestyle	17:43.57		Atharva Singh	Nepal	29 September 2025	Asian Championships	Ahmedabad, India	
50 m backstroke	29.70		Jaden Shrestha	-	6 June 2026	3rd Nepalese Championships	Lalitpur, Nepal	
100 m backstroke	1:03.39		Prarambha Bhandari	-	June 2025	2nd Nepal Aquatics Championship	Kathmandu, Nepal	
200 m backstroke	2:19.65		Prarambha Bhandari	-	June 2025	2nd Nepal Aquatics Championship	Kathmandu, Nepal	
50 m breaststroke	30.66		Bikash Kumal	-	June 2023	11th NSA Swimming Competition	Kathmandu, Nepal	
100m breaststroke	1:07.01		Jaden Shrestha	-	7 July 2026	3rd Nepalese Championships	Lalitpur, Nepal	
200m breaststroke	2:34.74		Bikash Kumal	-	June 2023	11th NSA Swimming Competition	Kathmandu, Nepal	
50m butterfly	26.05	h	Aviv Pradhan	Nepal	24 September 2026	Asian Games	Tokyo, Japan	
100m butterfly	59.60		Nasir Hussain	-	July 2022	NSA Cup	Kathmandu, Nepal	
200m butterfly	2:26.84		Sauren Bahadur Singh	-	7 July 2026	3rd Nepalese Championships	Lalitpur, Nepal	
200m individual medley	2:16.24	h	Nasir Hussain	Nepal	6 May 2022	National Championships	Kathmandu, Nepal	
400m individual medley	5:04.70		Shirish Gurung	Nepal	April 2016	Thailand Open	Bangkok, Thailand	
4×100m freestyle relay	3:48.57		Tenzin Gurung; Subigya Man Tuladhar; Ervin Shrestha; Seren Singh	Nepal	February 2024	BIMSTEC Championships	New Delhi, India	
4×200m freestyle relay	9:17.68		Manish Chitrakar (2:23.60); Shuvam Shrestha (2:26.87); Anubhav Subba (2:17.35); Sirish Gurung (2:09.86)	Nepal	9 February 2016	South Asian Games	Guwahati, India	
4×100m medley relay	4:10.71		Tenzin Gurung; Dipanker Awala; Alvin Maharjan; Seren Singh	Nepal	February 2024	BIMSTEC Championships	New Delhi, India	

Legend: # – Record awaiting ratification by NSA; WR – World record; AS – Asian record; e – equalled existing record;
Records not set in finals: h – heat; sf – semifinal; r – relay 1st leg; rh – relay heat 1st leg; b – B final; † – en route to final mark; so – swim-off; tt – time trial

=== Women ===
Event	Time		Name	Club	Date	Meet	Location	Ref
50m freestyle	28.09		Gaurika Singh	Tribhuvan Army Club	August 2017	National Games	Kathmandu, Nepal	
50m freestyle	27.95	not ratified	Gaurika Singh	Tribhuvan Army Club	3/4 June 2018	Nepalese Championships	Kathmandu, Nepal	
100m freestyle	1:00.11	h	Gaurika Singh	Nepal	28 July 2021	Olympic Games	Tokyo, Japan	
100m freestyle	59.60	not ratified	Gaurika Singh	Tribhuvan Army Club	22 April 2019	National Games	Nepalgunj, Nepal	
200m freestyle	2:11.94		Gaurika Singh	Tribhuvan Army Club	17 August 2017	Nepalese Championships	Lalitpur, Nepal	
400m freestyle	4:38.53		Duana Lama	Nepal	April 2023	Thailand Age Group Championships	Thailand	
800m freestyle	10:06.92		Duana Lama	-	June 2025	2nd Nepalese Championships	Kathmandu, Nepal	
1500m freestyle	19:06.23		Duana Lama	-	6 July 2026	3rd Nepalese Championships	Lalitpur, Nepal	
50m backstroke	30.80	h	Gaurika Singh	Nepal	14 February 2024	World Championships	Doha, Qatar	
100m backstroke	1:05.47	h	Gaurika Singh	Nepal	12 February 2024	World Championships	Doha, Qatar	
200m backstroke	2:25.58		Gaurika Singh	-	February 2020	Middlesex Country Championships	London, United Kingdom	
50m breaststroke	35.79		Duana Lama	-	June 2023 (Note: June 2022 by NSA source, a typo)	11th NSA Swimming Competition	Kathmandu, Nepal	
100m breaststroke	1:17.14		Duana Lama	Nepal	April 2024	59 MILO Age Group Championships	Bangkok, Malaysia	
200m breaststroke	2:46.75		Duana Lama	Nepal	April 2024	59 MILO Age Group Championships	Bangkok, Malaysia	
50m butterfly	29.40		Gaurika Singh	Tribhuvan Army Club	2017	National Game	Kathmandu, Nepal	
50m butterfly	29.38	not ratified	Gaurika Singh	Tribhuvan Army Club	17 August 2017	Nepalese Championships	Lalitpur, Nepal	
100m butterfly	1:07.69		Gaurika Singh	Tribhuvan Army Club	18 August 2017	Nepalese Championships	Lalitpur, Nepal	
200m butterfly	2:48.30		Devanshi Joshi	-	6 June 2026	3rd Nepalese Championships	Lalitpur, Nepal	
200m individual medley	2:33.26		Gaurika Singh	Nepal	10 February 2016	South Asian Games	Guwahati, India	
400m individual medley	5:47.69 (Note: by official result and FINA source; 2:58.54 by NSA source, unclear)		Sofia Shah	Nepal	7 February 2016	South Asian Games	Guwahati, India	
4×100m freestyle relay	4:32.17		Sofia Shah (1:02.31); Shreetika Singh (1:10.83); Sonira Bista (1:15.18); Gaurika Singh (1:03.85)	Nepal	6 February 2016	South Asian Games	Guwahati, India	
4×200m freestyle relay	9:58.34		Sofia Shah (2:16.13); Sonira Bista (2:45.12); Shreetika Singh (2:26.44); Gaurika Singh (2:20.65)	Nepal	9 February 2016	South Asian Games	Guwahati, India	
4×100m medley relay	5:05.54		Gaurika Singh (1:09.38); Sonira Bista (1:30.06); Shreetika Singh (1:23.67); Sofia Shah (1:02.43)	Nepal	10 February 2016	South Asian Games	Guwahati, India	

Legend: # – Record awaiting ratification by NSA; WR – World record; AS – Asian record; e – equalled existing record;
Records not set in finals: h – heat; sf – semifinal; r – relay 1st leg; rh – relay heat 1st leg; b – B final; † – en route to final mark; so – swim-off; tt – time trial

== Short Course (25 m) ==
=== Men ===
Event	Time		Name	Club	Date	Meet	Location	Ref
50m freestyle	23.90		Alexander Shah	Nepal	6 December 2019	South Asian Games	Kathmandu, Nepal	
100m freestyle	52.30	h	Alexander Shah	Nepal	20 December 2021	World Championships	Abu Dhabi, United Arab Emirates	
100m freestyle	51.87	'#'	Alexander Shah	Tribhuvan Army Club	15 October 2022	National Games	Pokhara, Nepal	
200m freestyle	1:56.27		Ervin Shrestha	-	6 December 2025	13th NSA Cup	Lalitpur, Nepal	
200m freestyle	1:55.39	'#'	Nasir Hussain	Tribhuvan Army Club	16 October 2022	National Games	Pokhara, Nepal	
400m freestyle	4:14.24		Kalkin Shrestha	-	6 December 2025	13th NSA Cup	Lalitpur, Nepal	
400m freestyle	4:08.64	'#'	Nasir Hussain	Tribhuvan Army Club	17 October 2022	National Games	Pokhara, Nepal	
800m freestyle	9:17.00		Nathan Dorje Sherpa	-	2019	National Game	Nepalgunj, Nepal	
1500m freestyle	17:05.64		Kalkin Shrestha	-	6 December 2025	13th NSA Cup	Lalitpur, Nepal	
1500m freestyle	16:50.21	'#'	Nasir Hussain	Tribhuvan Army Club	15 October 2022	National Games	Pokhara, Nepal	
50m backstroke	27.99		Aviv Pradhan	-	21 June 2026	3rd Bagamati Province Sports Championships	Lalitpur, Nepal	
50m backstroke	27.54	'#'	Alexander Shah	Tribhuvan Army Club		-	Nepal	
50m backstroke	27.46	'#'	Alexander Shah	Tribhuvan Army Club	17 October 2022	National Games	Pokhara, Nepal	
100m backstroke	1:00.59		Jaden Shrestha	-	7 December 2025	13th NSA Cup	Lalitpur, Nepal	
200m backstroke	2:15.62		Jaden Shrestha	-	8 February 2026	1st Lalitpur Mayor Cup	Lalitpur, Nepal	
50m breaststroke	31.05		Bikash Kumal	Province 1	23 September 2022	Nepalese Open Championships	Kathmandu, Nepal	
100m breaststroke	1:07.50		Bikash Kumal	Nepal	14 December 2022	World Championships	Melbourne, Australia	
200m breaststroke	2:30.15		Dipanker Awale	-	July 2024	Nepalese Championships	Kathmandu, Nepal	
200m breaststroke	2:29.60	'#'	Aashish Sapkota	-	17 October 2022	National Games	Pokhara, Nepal	
50m butterfly	25.52		Ajal Tamrakar	-	July 2024	Nepalese Championships	Kathmandu, Nepal	
100m butterfly	59.17		Ajal Tamrakar	-	July 2024	Nepalese Championships	Kathmandu, Nepal	
100m butterfly	57.86	not ratified	Nasir Hussain	Tribhuvan Army Club	17 October 2022	National Games	Pokhara, Nepal	
100m butterfly	57.39	h, not ratified	Anubhav Subba	Nepal	5 December 2019	South Asian Games	Kathmandu, Nepal	
200m butterfly	2:18.10		Nathan Dorje Sherpa	-	2019	National Game	Nepalgunj, Nepal	
100m individual medley	1:03.19		Tenzin Gurung	-	October 2024	World Championships Selection Game	Kathmandu, Nepal	
200m individual medley	2:11.85	h	Nasir Hussain	Nepal	16 December 2021	World Championships	Abu Dhabi, United Arab Emirates	
200m individual medley	2:11.23	'#'	Nasir Hussain	Tribhuvan Army Club	16 October 2022	National Games	Pokhara, Nepal	
400m individual medley	5:10.65	not ratified	Nasir Hussain	Nepal	7 December 2019	South Asian Games	Kathmandu, Nepal	
4×50m freestyle relay								
4×100m freestyle relay	4:01.09		Sayed Hamza Shah; Dipankar Awale; Tarun Bhandari; Gaurab Lama	Nepal	2019	National Game	Nepal	
4×100m freestyle relay	3:46.97	not ratified	Alexander Shah; Sayed Hamza Shah; Anubhav Subba; Tenzin Gurung	Nepal	5 December 2019	South Asian Games	Kathmandu, Nepal	
4×100m freestyle relay	3:46.83	'#'		Nepal Police Club		-	Nepal	
4×100m freestyle relay	3:45.51	'#'	Nasir Hussain; Anubhav Subba; Dilip Thapa Magar; Alexander Shah	Tribhuvan Army Club	17 October 2022	National Games	Pokhara, Nepal	
4×200m freestyle relay	8:23.17	not ratified		Nepal	8 December 2019	South Asian Games	Kathmandu, Nepal	
4×50m medley relay								
4×100m medley relay	4:07.07		Alexander Shah; Shuvam Shrestha; Anubhav Subba; Sayed Hamza Shah	Nepal	9 December 2019	South Asian Games	Kathmandu, Nepal	

Legend: # – Record awaiting ratification by NSA; WR – World record; AS – Asian record; e – equalled existing record;
Records not set in finals: h – heat; sf – semifinal; r – relay 1st leg; rh – relay heat 1st leg; b – B final; † – en route to final mark; so – swim-off; tt – time trial

=== Women ===
Event	Time		Name	Club	Date	Meet	Location	Ref
50m freestyle	27.37		Gaurika Singh	-	November 2019	Stockport Metro November Open Meet	Stockport, United Kingdom	
100m freestyle	58.13		Gaurika Singh	Nepal	9 December 2019	South Asian Games	Kathmandu, Nepal	
200m freestyle	2:05.06		Gaurika Singh	Nepal	5 December 2019	South Asian Games	Kathmandu, Nepal	
400m freestyle	4:25.28		Gaurika Singh	Nepal	8 December 2019	South Asian Games	Kathmandu, Nepal	
800m freestyle	9:39.22		Gaurika Singh	-	2019	National Game	Nepalgunj, Nepal	
1500m freestyle								
50m backstroke	29.71		Gaurika Singh	Nepal	8 December 2019	South Asian Games	Kathmandu, Nepal	
100m backstroke	1:03.15		Gaurika Singh	Nepal	7 December 2019	South Asian Games	Kathmandu, Nepal	
200m backstroke	2:17.33		Gaurika Singh	-	November 2019	Stockport Metro November Open Meet	Stockport, United Kingdom	
50m breaststroke	35.82	h	Duana Lama	Nepal	November 2018	World Cup	Singapore, Singapore	
50m breaststroke	35.46	not ratified	Duana Lama	Nepal	7 December 2019	South Asian Games	Kathmandu, Nepal	
50m breaststroke	35.23	'#'	Duana Lama	Tribhuvan Army Club	16 October 2022	National Games	Pokhara, Nepal	
100m breaststroke	1:16.99	h	Duana Lama	Nepal	November 2018	World Cup	Singapore, Singapore	
200m breaststroke	2:44.68		Duana Lama	Nepal	5 December 2019	South Asian Games	Kathmandu, Nepal	
200m breaststroke	2:43.23	'#'	Duana Lama	Tribhuvan Army Club	17 October 2022	National Games	Pokhara, Nepal	
50m butterfly	29.32		Gaurika Singh	-	November 2019	Stockport Metro November Open Meet	Stockport, United Kingdom	
100m butterfly	1:09.97		Gaurika Singh	-	2019	National Game	Nepalgunj, Nepal	
100m butterfly	1:07.74	'#'	Ashley Sapkota Dangol	NRNA	17 October 2022	National Games	Pokhara, Nepal	
200m butterfly	2:33.16		Duana Lama	Nepal	8 December 2019	South Asian Games	Kathmandu, Nepal	
100m individual medley								
200m individual medley	2:32.00		Gaurika Singh	-	2019	National Game	Nepalgunj, Nepal	
200m individual medley	2:31.46	h, #	Duana Lama	Tribhuvan Army Club	15 October 2022	National Games	Pokhara, Nepal	
200m individual medley	2:30.67	'#'	Duana Lama	Tribhuvan Army Club	15 October 2022	National Games	Pokhara, Nepal	
400m individual medley								
4×50m freestyle relay								
4×100m freestyle relay	4:07.97 (Note: by official result source; 4:12.97 by NSA source, a typo)		Gaurika Singh; Duana Lama; Tisa Shakya; Anushiya Tandukar	Nepal	5 December 2019	South Asian Games	Kathmandu, Nepal	
4×200m freestyle relay	9:03.04			Nepal	8 December 2019	South Asian Games	Kathmandu, Nepal	
4×50m medley relay								
4×100m medley relay	4:33.62		Gaurika Singh; Duana Lama; Tisa Shakya; Anushiya Tandukar	Nepal	9 December 2019	South Asian Games	Kathmandu, Nepal	

Legend: # – Record awaiting ratification by NSA; WR – World record; AS – Asian record; e – equalled existing record;
Records not set in finals: h – heat; sf – semifinal; r – relay 1st leg; rh – relay heat 1st leg; b – B final; † – en route to final mark; so – swim-off; tt – time trial
