= Nepal at the 2024 World Aquatics Championships =

- Flag of Nepal
- FINA code: NEP
- National federation: Nepal Swimming Association

in Doha, Qatar
- Competitors: 4 in 1 sport
- Medals: Gold 0 Silver 0 Bronze 0 Total 0

World Aquatics Championships appearances
- 1973; 1975; 1978; 1982; 1986; 1991; 1994; 1998; 2001; 2003; 2005; 2007; 2009; 2011; 2013; 2015; 2017; 2019; 2022; 2023; 2024

Nepal competed at the 2024 World Aquatics Championships in Doha, Qatar from 2 to 18 February.

== Competitors ==
The following is the list of competitors in the Championships.

Sport	Men	Women	Total
Swimming	2	2	4
Total	2	2	4

== Swimming ==
Nepal entered 4 swimmers.

Men

Athlete	Event	Heat		Semifinal		Final	
Athlete	Event	Time	Rank	Time	Rank	Time	Rank
Nasir Hussain	200 metre freestyle	1:56.39 NR	57	Did not advance			
Nasir Hussain	400 metre freestyle	4:05.65 NR	44	—		Did not advance	
Alexander Shah	50 metre freestyle	23.79	58	Did not advance			
Alexander Shah	100 metre freestyle	52.17 NR	62	Did not advance			

Women

Athlete	Event	Heat		Semifinal		Final	
Athlete	Event	Time	Rank	Time	Rank	Time	Rank
Duana Lama	200 metre freestyle	2:14.59	44	Did not advance			
Duana Lama	400 metre freestyle	4:45.85	32	—		Did not advance	
Gaurika Singh	50 metre backstroke	30.80 NR	42	Did not advance			
Gaurika Singh	100 metre backstroke	1:05.47 NR	43	Did not advance			
