= Nepal at the 2023 World Aquatics Championships =

- Flag of Nepal
- FINA code: NEP
- National federation: Nepal Swimming Association

in Fukuoka, Japan
- Competitors: 4 in 1 sport
- Medals: Gold 0 Silver 0 Bronze 0 Total 0

World Aquatics Championships appearances
- 1973; 1975; 1978; 1982; 1986; 1991; 1994; 1998; 2001; 2003; 2005; 2007; 2009; 2011; 2013; 2015; 2017; 2019; 2022; 2023; 2024

Nepal is set to compete at the 2023 World Aquatics Championships in Fukuoka, Japan from 14 to 30 July.

== Swimming ==
Nepal entered 4 swimmers.

Men

Athlete	Event	Heat		Semifinal		Final	
Athlete	Event	Time	Rank	Time	Rank	Time	Rank
Nasir Yahya Hussain	200 metre freestyle	1:57.26	59	Did not advance			
Nasir Yahya Hussain	400 metre freestyle	4:08.23 NR	46	—		Did not advance	
Alexander Shah	50 metre freestyle	23.89	68	Did not advance			
Alexander Shah	100 metre freestyle	52.94	81	Did not advance			

Women

Athlete	Event	Heat		Semifinal		Final	
Athlete	Event	Time	Rank	Time	Rank	Time	Rank
Duana Lama	100 metre freestyle	1:01.93	59	Did not advance			
Duana Lama	200 metre freestyle	2:12.46	55	Did not advance			
Gaurika Singh	50 metre backstroke	31.44	47	Did not advance			
Gaurika Singh	100 metre backstroke	1:06.80	51	Did not advance			
