= Nepal at the 2015 World Aquatics Championships =

- Flag of Nepal
- FINA code: NEP
- National federation: Nepal Swimming Association

in Kazan, Russia
- Competitors: 4 in 1 sport
- Medals: Gold 0 Silver 0 Bronze 0 Total 0

World Aquatics Championships appearances
- 1973; 1975; 1978; 1982; 1986; 1991; 1994; 1998; 2001; 2003; 2005; 2007; 2009; 2011; 2013; 2015; 2017; 2019; 2022; 2023; 2024

Nepal competed at the 2015 World Aquatics Championships in Kazan, Russia from 24 July to 9 August 2015.

== Swimming ==
Nepalese swimmers have achieved qualifying standards in the following events (up to a maximum of 2 swimmers in each event at the A-standard entry time, and 1 at the B-standard):

Men

Athlete	Event	Heat		Semifinal		Final	
Athlete	Event	Time	Rank	Time	Rank	Time	Rank
Sirish Gurung	50 m freestyle	27.45	99	did not advance			
Sirish Gurung	100 m freestyle	58.22	=100	did not advance			
Kiran Karki	50 m breaststroke	34.94	69	did not advance			
Kiran Karki	100 m breaststroke	1:18.21	75	did not advance			

Women

Athlete	Event	Heat		Semifinal		Final	
Athlete	Event	Time	Rank	Time	Rank	Time	Rank
Sofia Shah	50 m freestyle	29.43	85	did not advance			
Sofia Shah	200 m freestyle	2:18.93	60	did not advance			
Gaurika Singh	100 m freestyle	1:03.23	81	did not advance			
Gaurika Singh	100 m backstroke	1:08.12	58	did not advance			
