= Nepal at the 2019 World Aquatics Championships =

- Flag of Nepal
- FINA code: NEP
- National federation: Nepal Swimming Association

in Gwangju, South Korea
- Competitors: 4 in 1 sport
- Medals: Gold 0 Silver 0 Bronze 0 Total 0

World Aquatics Championships appearances
- 1973; 1975; 1978; 1982; 1986; 1991; 1994; 1998; 2001; 2003; 2005; 2007; 2009; 2011; 2013; 2015; 2017; 2019; 2022; 2023; 2024

Nepal competed at the 2019 World Aquatics Championships in Gwangju, South Korea from 12 to 28 July.

== Swimming ==
Nepal entered four swimmers.

Men

Athlete	Event	Heat		Semifinal		Final	
Athlete	Event	Time	Rank	Time	Rank	Time	Rank
Alexander Shah	50 m freestyle	25.38	=101	did not advance			
Alexander Shah	100 m freestyle	56.28	102	did not advance			
Shuvam Shrestha	100 m breaststroke	1:11.74	84	did not advance			
Shuvam Shrestha	200 m breaststroke	2:38.79	52	did not advance			

Women

Athlete	Event	Heat		Semifinal		Final	
Athlete	Event	Time	Rank	Time	Rank	Time	Rank
Sofia Shah	50 m freestyle	29.05	71	did not advance			
Sofia Shah	50 m butterfly	32.04	55	did not advance			
Gaurika Singh	100 m freestyle	1:00.62	69	did not advance			
Gaurika Singh	200 m freestyle	2:13.00	48	did not advance			
