= Nicaragua at the 2023 World Aquatics Championships =

- Flag of Nicaragua
- FINA code: NCA
- National federation: Federación de Natación de Nicaragua

in Fukuoka, Japan
- Competitors: 2 in 1 sport
- Medals: Gold 0 Silver 0 Bronze 0 Total 0

World Aquatics Championships appearances
- 1973; 1975; 1978; 1982; 1986; 1991; 1994; 1998; 2001; 2003; 2005; 2007; 2009; 2011; 2013; 2015; 2017; 2019; 2022; 2023; 2024

Nicaragua competed at the 2023 World Aquatics Championships, which were held in Fukuoka, Japan, from 14 to 30 July.

== Swimming ==
Nicaragua entered 2 swimmers.

Men

Athlete	Event	Heat		Semifinal		Final	
Athlete	Event	Time	Rank	Time	Rank	Time	Rank
Gerald Hernández	400 metre freestyle	4:05.13 NR	40	—		Did not advance	
Gerald Hernández	200 metre butterfly	2:07.28	34	Did not advance			

Women

Athlete	Event	Heat		Semifinal		Final	
Athlete	Event	Time	Rank	Time	Rank	Time	Rank
María Schutzmeier	50 metre butterfly	28.58	41	Did not advance			
María Schutzmeier	100 metre butterfly	1:02.56	38	Did not advance			
