= Nepal at the 2017 World Aquatics Championships =

- Flag of Nepal
- FINA code: NEP
- National federation: Nepal Swimming Association

in Budapest, Hungary
- Competitors: 4 in 1 sport
- Medals: Gold 0 Silver 0 Bronze 0 Total 0

World Aquatics Championships appearances
- 1973; 1975; 1978; 1982; 1986; 1991; 1994; 1998; 2001; 2003; 2005; 2007; 2009; 2011; 2013; 2015; 2017; 2019; 2022; 2023; 2024

Nepal competed at the 2017 World Aquatics Championships in Budapest, Hungary from 14 July to 30 July.

== Swimming ==
Nepal has received a Universality invitation from FINA to send a maximum of four swimmers (two men and two women) to the World Championships.

Athlete	Event	Heat		Semifinal		Final	
Athlete	Event	Time	Rank	Time	Rank	Time	Rank
Shuvam Shrestha	Men's 50 m breaststroke	32.50	68	did not advance			
Shuvam Shrestha	Men's 100 m breaststroke	1:11.34	70	did not advance			
Anubhav Subba	Men's 100 m freestyle	59.11	106	did not advance			
Anubhav Subba	Men's 50 m butterfly	28.26	74	did not advance			
Sofia Shah	Women's 50 m freestyle	29.73	69	did not advance			
Sofia Shah	Women's 100 m freestyle	1:04.83	69	did not advance			
Tisa Shakya	Women's 200 m freestyle	2:29.20	51	did not advance			
Tisa Shakya	Women's 100 m breaststroke	1:26.13	52	did not advance			
