= Nicaragua at the 2017 World Aquatics Championships =

- Flag of Nicaragua
- FINA code: NCA
- National federation: Federación de Natación de Nicaragua

in Budapest, Hungary
- Competitors: 3 in 1 sport
- Medals: Gold 0 Silver 0 Bronze 0 Total 0

World Aquatics Championships appearances
- 1973; 1975; 1978; 1982; 1986; 1991; 1994; 1998; 2001; 2003; 2005; 2007; 2009; 2011; 2013; 2015; 2017; 2019; 2022; 2023; 2024

Nicaragua competed at the 2017 World Aquatics Championships in Budapest, Hungary from 14 July to 30 July.

== Swimming ==
Nicaragua has received a Universality invitation from FINA to send three swimmers (two men and one woman) to the World Championships.

Athlete	Event	Heat		Semifinal		Final	
Athlete	Event	Time	Rank	Time	Rank	Time	Rank
Eisner Barberena	Men's 100 m backstroke	59.82	41	did not advance			
Eisner Barberena	Men's 200 m backstroke	2:11.92	39	did not advance			
Miguel Mena	Men's 50 m freestyle	24.27	=86	did not advance			
Miguel Mena	Men's 100 m freestyle	53.68	79	did not advance			
Gabriela Hernandez	Women's 50 m freestyle	28.07	57	did not advance			
Gabriela Hernandez	Women's 100 m freestyle	1:01.15	63	did not advance			
