= Nicaragua at the 2015 World Aquatics Championships =

- Flag of Nicaragua
- FINA code: NCA
- National federation: Federación de Natación de Nicaragua

in Kazan, Russia
- Competitors: 3 in 1 sport
- Medals: Gold 0 Silver 0 Bronze 0 Total 0

World Aquatics Championships appearances
- 1973; 1975; 1978; 1982; 1986; 1991; 1994; 1998; 2001; 2003; 2005; 2007; 2009; 2011; 2013; 2015; 2017; 2019; 2022; 2023; 2024

Nicaragua competed at the 2015 World Aquatics Championships in Kazan, Russia from 24 July to 9 August 2015.

== Swimming ==
Nicaraguan swimmers have achieved qualifying standards in the following events (up to a maximum of 2 swimmers in each event at the A-standard entry time, and 1 at the B-standard):

Men

Athlete	Event	Heat		Semifinal		Final	
Athlete	Event	Time	Rank	Time	Rank	Time	Rank
Eisner Barberena	50 m backstroke	27.35	53	did not advance			
Eisner Barberena	100 m backstroke	58.95	53	did not advance			
Miguel Mena	50 m freestyle	24.25	62	did not advance			
Miguel Mena	100 m freestyle	52.78	77	did not advance			

Women

Athlete	Event	Heat		Semifinal		Final	
Athlete	Event	Time	Rank	Time	Rank	Time	Rank
Dalia Torrez Zamora	50 m butterfly	29.31	49	did not advance			
Dalia Torrez Zamora	100 m butterfly	1:04.75	54	did not advance			
