= Nepal at the 2013 World Aquatics Championships =

- Flag of Nepal
- FINA code: NEP
- National federation: Nepal Swimming Association

in Barcelona, Spain
- Competitors: 4 in 1 sports
- Medals: Gold 0 Silver 0 Bronze 0 Total 0

World Aquatics Championships appearances
- 1973; 1975; 1978; 1982; 1986; 1991; 1994; 1998; 2001; 2003; 2005; 2007; 2009; 2011; 2013; 2015; 2017; 2019; 2022; 2023; 2024

Nepal competed at the 2013 World Aquatics Championships in Barcelona, Spain between 19 July and 4 August 2013.

== Swimming ==
Nepalese swimmers achieved qualifying standards in the following events (up to a maximum of 2 swimmers in each event at the A-standard entry time, and 1 at the B-standard):

Men

Athlete	Event	Heat		Semifinal		Final	
Athlete	Event	Time	Rank	Time	Rank	Time	Rank
Sirish Gurung	100 m freestyle	1:02.12	80	did not advance			
Sirish Gurung	200 m freestyle	2:14.56	68	did not advance			
Miraj Prajapati	50 m freestyle	28.74	95	did not advance			
Miraj Prajapati	50 m backstroke	34.74	47	did not advance			

Women

Athlete	Event	Heat		Semifinal		Final	
Athlete	Event	Time	Rank	Time	Rank	Time	Rank
Shreya Dhital	100 m freestyle	1:11.12	69	did not advance			
Shreya Dhital	50 m butterfly	34.01	58	did not advance			
Sofia Shah	50 m freestyle	30.16	70	did not advance			
Sofia Shah	200 m freestyle	2:31.79	43	did not advance			
