= Miguel Mena =

Miguel Mena may refer to:

- Miguel Mena (jockey) (1986–2021), Peruvian-born American jockey
- Miguel Mena (swimmer) (born 1997), Nicaraguan swimmer
