= Nicaragua at the 2022 World Aquatics Championships =

- Flag of Nicaragua
- FINA code: NCA
- National federation: Federación de Natación de Nicaragua

in Budapest, Hungary 18 June 2022 – 3 July 2022
- Competitors: 2 in 1 sport
- Medals Ranked 0th: Gold 0 Silver 0 Bronze 0 Total 0

World Aquatics Championships appearances
- 1973; 1975; 1978; 1982; 1986; 1991; 1994; 1998; 2001; 2003; 2005; 2007; 2009; 2011; 2013; 2015; 2017; 2019; 2022; 2023; 2024

Nicaragua competed at the 2022 World Aquatics Championships in Budapest, Hungary from 18 June to 3 July.

== Athletes by discipline ==
The following is the list of number of competitors participating at the Championships per discipline.

Sport	Men	Women	Total
Artistic swimming	0	0	0
Diving	0	0	0
Open water swimming	0	0	0
Swimming	1	1	2
Water polo	0	0	0
Total	1	1	2

== Swimming ==
Men

Athlete	Event	Heat		Semifinal		Final	
Athlete	Event	Time	Rank	Time	Rank	Time	Rank
Gerald Hernández	100 m butterfly	57.75	53	did not advance			
Gerald Hernández	200 m butterfly	2:09.26	40	did not advance			

Women

Athlete	Event	Heat		Semifinal		Final	
Athlete	Event	Time	Rank	Time	Rank	Time	Rank
María Schutzmeier	50 m freestyle	27.20	46	did not advance			
María Schutzmeier	50 m butterfly	28.33	41	did not advance			
