= Nicaragua at the 2019 World Aquatics Championships =

- Flag of Nicaragua
- FINA code: NCA
- National federation: Federación de Natación de Nicaragua

in Gwangju, South Korea
- Competitors: 3 in 1 sport
- Medals: Gold 0 Silver 0 Bronze 0 Total 0

World Aquatics Championships appearances
- 1973; 1975; 1978; 1982; 1986; 1991; 1994; 1998; 2001; 2003; 2005; 2007; 2009; 2011; 2013; 2015; 2017; 2019; 2022; 2023; 2024

Nicaragua competed at the 2019 World Aquatics Championships in Gwangju, South Korea from 12 to 28 July.

== Swimming ==
Nicaragua entered three swimmers.

Men

Athlete	Event	Heat		Semifinal		Final	
Athlete	Event	Time	Rank	Time	Rank	Time	Rank
Eisner Barberena	50 m backstroke	28.25	59	did not advance			
Eisner Barberena	100 m backstroke	1:00.56	57	did not advance			
Miguel Mena	50 m freestyle	24.19	78	did not advance			
Miguel Mena	100 m freestyle	52.20	75	did not advance			

Women

Athlete	Event	Heat		Semifinal		Final	
Athlete	Event	Time	Rank	Time	Rank	Time	Rank
Maria Schutzmeier	100 m freestyle	59.08	=51	did not advance			
Maria Schutzmeier	50 m butterfly	28.34	40	did not advance			
