= List of Nicaraguan records in swimming =

The Nicaraguan records in swimming are the fastest ever performances of swimmers from Nicaragua, which are recognised and ratified by the Fedaracion de Natacion de Nicaragua (FENANICA).

All records were set in finals unless noted otherwise.

== Long Course (50 m) ==
=== Men ===
Event	Time		Name	Club	Date	Meet	Location	Ref
50 m freestyle	23.57	h	Erick Blandon	Nicaragua	1 August 2025	World Championships	Singapore, Singapore	
100 m freestyle	51.89	rh	Miguel Mena	Nicaragua	23 July 2018	CAC Games	Barranquilla, Colombia	
200 m freestyle	1:55.02		Miguel Mena	Nicaragua	4 December 2017	Central American Games	Managua, Nicaragua	
400 m freestyle	4:05.13	h	Gerald Hernandez	Nicaragua	23 July 2023	World Championships	Fukuoka, Japan	
800 m freestyle	8:35.27		Gerald Hernandez	Nicaragua	23 April 2023	ALBA Games	Caracas, Venezuela	
1500 m freestyle	16:25.80		Gerald Hernandez	-	2022	Nicaraguan Championships	Managua, Nicaragua	
50 m backstroke	27.15	h	Eisner Barberena	Nicaragua	24 July 2018	CAC Games	Barranquilla, Colombia	
100 m backstroke	58.78		Aldo Zepeda	Barracuda	11 April 2025	X Dominican Republic International Open	Santiago de los Caballeros, Dominican Republic	
200 m backstroke	2:11.68		Eisner Barbarena	Nicaragua	June 2016	CAMEX	Panama City, Panama	
50 m breaststroke	32.00		Julio Vargas	Nicaragua	25 March 2018	Nicaraguan Championships	Managua, Nicaragua	
100 m breaststroke	1:07.74		Miguel Mena	Nicaragua	18 March 2016	Nicaraguan Championships	Managua, Nicaragua	
200 m breaststroke	2:39.30	h	Rodrigo Guerra Su	Nicaragua	22 August 2017	Universiade	Taipei, Taiwan	
50m butterfly	24.91		Gerald Hernandez	Nicaragua	11 July 2026	Pan American Championships	Ibague, Colombia	
100m butterfly	55.62		Gerald Hernandez	Nicaragua	9 July 2026	Pan American Championships	Ibague, Colombia	
200m butterfly	2:03.99		Gerald Hernandez	Nicaragua	29 July 2026	CAC Games	Santo Domingo, Dominican Republic	
200m individual medley	2:10.86		Miguel Mena	Nicaragua	8 December 2017	Central American Games	Managua, Nicaragua	
400m individual medley								
4 × 100 m freestyle relay	3:33.18		Erick Blandon (52.33); Aldo Zepeda (53.95); Gerald Hernandez (53.98); Michael Baltodano (52.92)	Nicaragua	19 October 2025	Central American Games	Guatemala City, Guatemala	
4 × 200 m freestyle relay								
4 × 100 m medley relay	4:06.65		Aldo Zepeda (1:00.11); Michael Baltodano (1:13.10); Gerald Hernandez (57.68); Erick Blandon (55.76)	Nicaragua	22 October 2025	Central American Games	Guatemala City, Guatemala	

Legend: # – Record awaiting ratification by Fedaracion de Natacion de Nicaragua; WR – World record; AM – Americas record;
Records not set in finals: h – heat; sf – semifinal; r – relay 1st leg; rh – relay heat 1st leg; b – B final; † – en route to final mark; so – swim-off; tt – time trial

=== Women ===
Event	Time		Name	Club	Date	Meet	Location	Ref
50m freestyle	26.62		Maria Schutzmeier	Pirañas	April 2021	Nicaraguan Championships	Managua, Nicaragua	
100m freestyle	57.94	h	Maria Schutzmeier	Nicaragua	28 July 2021	Olympic Games	Tokyo, Japan	
200m freestyle	2:12.58		Maria Schutzmeier	Pirañas	21 March 2019	Nicaraguan Junior Championships	Managua, Nicaragua	
400m freestyle	4:47.38		Karla Abarca	Nicaragua	28 June 2019	CCCAN Championships	Bridgetown, Barbados	
800m freestyle	9:51.92		Fernanda Cuadra	-	12 October 1998			
1500m freestyle	19:03.43		Sofia Maher	Barracudas	18 June 2015			
50m backstroke	30.28		María Schutzmeier	Pirañas	23 April 2021	Nicaraguan Championships	Managua, Nicaragua	
100m backstroke	1:07.76		María Schutzmeier	Pirañas	April 2021	Nicaraguan Championships	Managua, Nicaragua	
200m backstroke	2:32.33		Germania Jarquin	-	9 June 2016			
50m breaststroke	34.77		Carmen Guerra	Nicaragua	9 June 2018	Copa El Salvador	Santa Tecla, El Salvador	
100m breaststroke	1:16.89		Carmen Guerra	Nicaragua	June 2016	CAMEX	Panama City, Panama	
200m breaststroke	2:48.93	h	Carmen Guerra	Nicaragua	23 August 2017	Universiade	Taipei, Taiwan	
50m butterfly	27.75		Maria Schutzmeier	Pirañas	April 2021	Nicaraguan Championships	Managua, Nicaragua	
100m butterfly	1:02.41		Maria Schutzmeier	Pirañas	April 2021	Nicaraguan Championships	Managua, Nicaragua	
200m butterfly	2:29.78		Karla Abarca	-	26 March 2022	Nicaraguan Junior Championships	Managua, Nicaragua	
200m individual medley	2:30.50		Karla Abarca	-		Campeonato de Velocidad	Managua, Nicaragua	
400m individual medley	5:20.14	h	Abarca Karla	Nicaragua	30 June 2019	CCCAN Championships	Bridgetown, Barbados	
4 × 100 m freestyle relay								
4 × 200 m freestyle relay								
4 × 100 m medley relay	4:56.91		Bello; Castañeda; Karla Abarca; María Hernández	Nicaragua	May 2017	Copa El Salvador	San Salvador, El Salvador	

Legend: # – Record awaiting ratification by Fedaracion de Natacion de Nicaragua; WR – World record; AM – Americas record;
Records not set in finals: h – heat; sf – semifinal; r – relay 1st leg; rh – relay heat 1st leg; b – B final; † – en route to final mark; so – swim-off; tt – time trial

=== Mixed relay ===
Event	Time	Name	Club	Date	Meet	Location	Ref
4 × 50 m freestyle relay	1:45.33	Miguel Mena; Kenner Tórrez; María Hernández; Karla Abarca	Nicaragua	May 2017	Copa El Salvador	San Salvador, El Salvador	
4 × 50 m medley relay	1:59.52	María Hernández; Karla Abarca; Miguel Mena; Rodrigo Guerra	Nicaragua	May 2017	Copa El Salvador	San Salvador, El Salvador	

Legend: # – Record awaiting ratification by Fedaracion de Natacion de Nicaragua; WR – World record; AM – Americas record;
Records not set in finals: h – heat; so – swim-off

== Short Course (25 m) ==
=== Men ===
Event	Time		Name	Club	Date	Meet	Location	Ref
50m freestyle	23.79	h	Miguel Mena	Nicaragua	18 December 2021	World Championships	Abu Dhabi, United Arab Emirates	
100m freestyle	52.12	h	Miguel Mena	Nicaragua	20 December 2021	World Championships	Abu Dhabi, United Arab Emirates	
200m freestyle	1:55.24	h	Fernando Medrano Medina	Nicaragua	9 April 2008	World Championships	Manchester, Great Britain	
400m freestyle	4:13.60	h	Omar Nunez	Nicaragua	11 April 2008	World Championships	Manchester, Great Britain	
800m freestyle	9:05.96	†	Omar Nunez	Nicaragua	13 April 2008	World Championships	Manchester, Great Britain	
1500m freestyle	17:14.00		Omar Nunez	Nicaragua	13 April 2008	World Championships	Manchester, Great Britain	
50m backstroke	26.17	h	Eisner Barberena Espinoza	Nicaragua	8 December 2016	World Championships	Windsor, Canada	
100m backstroke	56.78	h	Eisner Barberena Espinoza	Nicaragua	11 December 2018	World Championships	Hangzhou, China	
200m backstroke	2:06.75	h	Eisner Barberena Espinoza	Nicaragua	11 December 2016	World Championships	Windsor, Canada	
50m breaststroke	30.48	h, †	Miguel Mena	Nicaragua	6 December 2016	World Championships	Windsor, Canada	
100m breaststroke	1:06.54	h	Miguel Mena	Nicaragua	6 December 2016	World Championships	Windsor, Canada	
200m breaststroke	2:34.57	h	Miguel Mena	Nicaragua	8 December 2016	World Championships	Windsor, Canada	
50m butterfly	26.11	h	Miguel Mena	Nicaragua	5 December 2014	World Championships	Doha, Qatar	
100m butterfly	57.06	h	Miguel Mena	Nicaragua	7 December 2016	World Championships	Windsor, Canada	
200m butterfly	2:13.20	h	Omar Nunez	Nicaragua	13 April 2008	World Championships	Manchester, Great Britain	
100m individual medley	58.49	h	Miguel Mena	Nicaragua	8 December 2016	World Championships	Windsor, Canada	
200 m individual medley								
400 m individual medley								
4 × 50 m freestyle relay								
4 × 100 m freestyle relay								
4 × 200 m freestyle relay								
4 × 50 m medley relay								
4 × 100 m medley relay								

Legend: # – Record awaiting ratification by Fedaracion de Natacion de Nicaragua; WR – World record; AM – Americas record;
Records not set in finals: h – heat; sf – semifinal; r – relay 1st leg; rh – relay heat 1st leg; b – B final; † – en route to final mark; so – swim-off; tt – time trial

=== Women ===
Event	Time		Name	Club	Date	Meet	Location	Ref
50m freestyle	26.55		Maria Schutzmeier	Pirañas	23 August 2018	Nicaraguan Championships	Nicaragua	
100m freestyle	56.97	h	Maria Schutzmeier	Nicaragua	17 December 2021	World Championships	Abu Dhabi, United Arab Emirates	
200m freestyle	2:07.90		Maria Schutzmeier	Pirañas	23 August 2018	Nicaraguan Age Group Championships	Nicaragua	
400m freestyle	4:40.67		Karla Abarca	Barracudas	23 August 2018	Nicaraguan Age Group Championships	Nicaragua	
800m freestyle	9:39.18		Karla Abarca	Barracudas	28 September 2018	Nicaraguan Championships	Nicaragua	
1500m freestyle	18:42.80		Karla Abarca	Barracudas	28 September 2018	Nicaraguan Championships	Nicaragua	
50m backstroke	30.40		María Hernández	Delfines	29 August 2019	Nicaraguan Age Group Championships	Nicaragua	
100m backstroke	1:06.68		Fernanda Bello	Delfines	27 September 2019	Nicaraguan Championships	Nicaragua	
200 m backstroke								
50m breaststroke	35.17	h	Dalia Tórrez Zamora	Nicaragua	12 December 2012	World Championships	Istanbul, Turkey	
100 m breaststroke								
200 m breaststroke								
50m butterfly	28.84	h	María Hernández	Nicaragua	13 December 2018	World Championships	Hangzhou, China	
100m butterfly	1:04.09	h	Karla Abarca	Nicaragua	15 December 2018	World Championships	Hangzhou, China	
200 m butterfly								
100m individual medley	1:08.39	h	Dalia Tórrez Zamora	Nicaragua	13 December 2012	World Championships	Istanbul, Turkey	
200 m individual medley								
400 m individual medley								
4 × 50 m freestyle relay								
4 × 100 m freestyle relay								
4 × 200 m freestyle relay								
4 × 50 m medley relay								
4 × 100 m medley relay								

Legend: # – Record awaiting ratification by Fedaracion de Natacion de Nicaragua; WR – World record; AM – Americas record;
Records not set in finals: h – heat; sf – semifinal; r – relay 1st leg; rh – relay heat 1st leg; b – B final; † – en route to final mark; so – swim-off; tt – time trial

=== Mixed relay ===
Event	Time		Name	Club	Date	Meet	Location	Ref
4 × 50 m freestyle relay	1:43.15	h	María Hernández (27.12); Eisner Barberena (23.85); Karla Abarca (27.54); Kener Torrez (24.64)	Nicaragua	12 December 2018	World Championships	Hangzhou, China	
4 × 50 m medley relay	1:54.41	h	Eisner Barberena (26.56); Kener Torrez (31.98); Karla Abarca (29.10); María Hernández (26.77)	Nicaragua	13 December 2018	World Championships	Hangzhou, China	

Legend: # – Record awaiting ratification by Fedaracion de Natacion de Nicaragua;
Records not set in finals: h – heat; so – swim-off
