= Sirish =

Sirish is a given name. Notable people with the name include:

- Allu Sirish (born 1987), Indian actor
- Sirish Gurung (born 1998), Nepalese swimmer
