= Nicaragua at the 2024 World Aquatics Championships =

- Flag of Nicaragua
- FINA code: NCA
- National federation: Federación de Natación de Nicaragua

in Doha, Qatar
- Competitors: 2 in 1 sport
- Medals: Gold 0 Silver 0 Bronze 0 Total 0

World Aquatics Championships appearances
- 1973; 1975; 1978; 1982; 1986; 1991; 1994; 1998; 2001; 2003; 2005; 2007; 2009; 2011; 2013; 2015; 2017; 2019; 2022; 2023; 2024

Nicaragua competed at the 2024 World Aquatics Championships in Doha, Qatar from 2 to 18 February.

== Competitors ==
The following is the list of competitors in the Championships.

Sport	Men	Women	Total
Swimming	1	1	2
Total	1	1	2

== Swimming ==
Nicaragua entered 2 swimmers.

Men

Athlete	Event	Heat		Semifinal		Final	
Athlete	Event	Time	Rank	Time	Rank	Time	Rank
Gerald Hernández	400 metre freestyle	Did not start		—		Did not advance	
Gerald Hernández	200 metre butterfly	Did not start				Did not advance	

Women

Athlete	Event	Heat		Semifinal		Final	
Athlete	Event	Time	Rank	Time	Rank	Time	Rank
María Schutzmeier	100 metre freestyle	Did not start		Did not advance			
María Schutzmeier	100 metre butterfly	Did not start		Did not advance			
