= 2016 FINA World Swimming Championships (25 m) – Men's 200 metre breaststroke =

Men's 200 metre breaststroke at the 2016 FINA World Swimming Championships (25 m)
- Venue: WFCU Centre
- Dates: 8 December (heats and final)
- Competitors: 59 from 45 nations
- Winning time: 2:01.21 CR

Medalists
gold medal	Marco Koch	Germany
silver medal	Andrew Willis	Great Britain
bronze medal	Mikhail Dorinov	Russia

The Men's 200 metre breaststroke competition of the 2016 FINA World Swimming Championships (25 m) was held on 8 December 2016.

== Records ==
Prior to the competition, the existing world and championship records were as follows.

	Name	Nation	Time	Location	Date
World record	Marco Koch	Germany	2:00.44	Berlin	20 November 2016
Championship record	Dániel Gyurta	Hungary	2:01.35	Istanbul	14 December 2012

The following records were established during the competition:

Date	Event	Name	Nation	Time	Record
8 December	Final	Marco Koch	Germany	2:01.21	CR

== Results ==
=== Heats ===
The heats were held at 11:27.

Rank	Heat	Lane	Name	Nationality	Time	Notes
1	7	4	Marco Koch	Germany	2:03.69	Q
2	5	4	Andrew Willis	Great Britain	2:03.88	Q
3	7	5	Mikhail Dorinov	Russia	2:04.19	Q
4	7	6	Josh Prenot	United States	2:04.52	Q
5	7	3	Ilya Khomenko	Russia	2:04.63	Q
6	5	5	Nic Fink	United States	2:04.69	Q
6	6	3	Yukihiro Takahashi	Japan	2:04.69	Q
8	5	6	Erik Persson	Sweden	2:04.93	Q
9	6	4	Thiago Simon	Brazil	2:04.96	
10	5	3	Ross Murdoch	Great Britain	2:05.11	
11	7	2	Mao Feilian	China	2:05.15	
12	6	6	Kozuki Kohinata	Japan	2:05.53	
13	5	0	Carlos Claverie	Venezuela	2:05.84	NR
14	5	1	Yan Zibei	China	2:06.54	
15	6	8	Dávid Verrasztó	Hungary	2:06.73	
16	7	1	Jonas Coreelman	Belgium	2:06.83	NR
17	6	2	Ilya Shymanovich	Belarus	2:07.91	
18	6	5	Felipe França Silva	Brazil	2:08.05	
19	7	0	Christopher Rothbauer	Austria	2:08.51	
20	6	1	Johannes Dietrich	Austria	2:09.78	
21	6	7	Jean Dencausse	France	2:09.87	
22	5	8	Andrius Šidlauskas	Lithuania	2:11.20	
23	4	7	Lee Hsuan-yen	Chinese Taipei	2:11.34	
24	7	7	Roman Trussov	Kazakhstan	2:11.42	
25	6	9	Daniils Bobrovs	Latvia	2:11.44	
26	5	9	Chao Man Hou	Macau	2:11.47	
27	7	9	Alaric Basson	South Africa	2:12.19	
28	4	6	Youssef Elkamash	Egypt	2:12.44	NR
29	6	0	Radomyos Matjiur	Thailand	2:12.63	NR
30	3	4	Jordy Groters	Aruba	2:12.68	NR
31	4	4	Khoo Chien Yin Lionel	Singapore	2:13.53	
32	4	9	Viktor Vilbergsson	Iceland	2:14.52	
33	7	8	Jorge Murillo	Colombia	2:14.66	
34	2	3	Marc Rojas	Dominican Republic	2:15.12	
35	3	1	Arnoldo Herrera	Costa Rica	2:15.28	
36	3	3	Arya Nasimi Shad	Iran	2:15.29	NR
37	3	2	Jarryd Baxter	South Africa	2:15.34	
38	3	0	Pedro Pinotes	Angola	2:15.39	NR
39	3	8	Rafael Alfaro	El Salvador	2:15.71	
40	3	6	Jose Solis Rosales	Costa Rica	2:16.02	NR
41	4	0	Denis Petrashov	Kyrgyzstan	2:16.13	
42	1	3	James Deiparine	Philippines	2:16.99	
43	3	5	Sultan Bukeev	Kyrgyzstan	2:17.30	
44	2	2	Darren Chan Chin Wah	Mauritius	2:17.43	NR
45	2	4	James Lawson	Zimbabwe	2:17.48	
46	3	9	Ryan Maskelyne	Papua New Guinea	2:17.57	NR
47	2	6	Felipe Quiroz Uteau	Chile	2:18.50	NR
48	1	5	Christopher Cheong	Singapore	2:19.38	
49	2	5	Fausto Huerta	Dominican Republic	2:21.40	
50	2	0	Alberto Batungbacal	Philippines	2:21.97	
51	2	1	Deni Baholli	Albania	2:22.42	NR
52	2	7	Brandon Schuster	Samoa	2:22.58	NR
53	4	5	Tsui Hoi Tung Ronald	Hong Kong	2:22.75	
54	4	3	Jason Block	Canada	2:24.03	
55	2	9	Samuele Rossi	Seychelles	2:29.00	NR
56	2	8	Rainier Rafaela	Curaçao	2:33.75	NR
57	1	4	Miguel Mena	Nicaragua	2:34.57	NR
	4	1	Azad Al-Barazi	Syria		DSQ
	4	8	Gregory Penny	United States Virgin Islands		DSQ
	3	7	Julian Fletcher	Bermuda		DNS
	4	2	Richard Funk	Canada		DNS
	5	2	Martin Liivamägi	Estonia		DNS
	5	7	Martin Allikvee	Estonia		DNS

=== Final ===
The final was held at 18:30.

Rank	Lane	Name	Nationality	Time	Notes
1st place, gold medalist(s)	4	Marco Koch	Germany	2:01.21	CR
2nd place, silver medalist(s)	5	Andrew Willis	Great Britain	2:02.71	
3rd place, bronze medalist(s)	3	Mikhail Dorinov	Russia	2:03.09	
4	7	Nic Fink	United States	2:03.79	
5	6	Josh Prenot	United States	2:03.96	
6	8	Erik Persson	Sweden	2:04.83	
7	2	Ilya Khomenko	Russia	2:04.97	
8	1	Yukihiro Takahashi	Japan	2:05.40	
