= Swimming at the 2023 World Aquatics Championships – Men's 400 metre freestyle =

Men's 400 metre freestyle at the 2023 World Aquatics Championships
- Venue: Marine Messe Fukuoka
- Location: Fukuoka, Japan
- Dates: 23 July (heats and final)
- Competitors: 55 from 51 nations
- Winning time: 3:40.68

Medalists
gold medal	Samuel Short	Australia
silver medal	Ahmed Hafnaoui	Tunisia
bronze medal	Lukas Märtens	Germany

The men's 400 metre freestyle competition at the 2023 World Aquatics Championships was held on 23 July 2023.

== Records ==
Prior to the competition, the existing world and championship records were as follows.

World record	Paul Biedermann (GER)	3:40.07	Rome, Italy	26 July 2009
Competition record	Paul Biedermann (GER)	3:40.07	Rome, Italy	26 July 2009

== Results ==
=== Heats ===
The heats were started at 10:47.

Rank	Heat	Lane	Name	Nationality	Time	Notes
1	6	4	Samuel Short	Australia	3:42.44	Q
2	6	3	Felix Auböck	Austria	3:44.14	Q
3	5	5	Guilherme Costa	Brazil	3:44.17	Q
4	5	7	Ahmed Hafnaoui	Tunisia	3:44.34	Q
5	5	4	Lukas Märtens	Germany	3:44.42	Q
6	6	2	Kim Woo-min	South Korea	3:44.52	Q
7	6	5	Elijah Winnington	Australia	3:44.63	Q
8	5	3	Antonio Djakovic	Switzerland	3:45.43	Q
9	5	2	Kieran Smith	United States	3:45.77	
10	6	0	Kristóf Rasovszky	Hungary	3:46.56	
11	5	0	Alfonso Mestre	Venezuela	3:46.61	NR
12	6	6	Marco De Tullio	Italy	3:47.23	
13	5	1	Lucas Henveaux	Belgium	3:47.88	
14	6	1	Matteo Ciampi	Italy	3:48.12	
15	5	8	Marwan Elkamash	Egypt	3:48.31	
16	4	7	Kregor Zirk	Estonia	3:48.43	
17	6	7	David Johnston	United States	3:48.68	
18	4	5	Bar Soloveychik	Israel	3:49.21	
19	4	2	Dimitrios Markos	Greece	3:49.41	
20	4	1	Carlos Quijada	Spain	3:49.60	
21	5	6	Oliver Klemet	Germany	3:49.79	
22	4	6	Krzysztof Chmielewski	Poland	3:49.90	
23	4	8	Eric Brown	Canada	3:50.68	
24	4	3	Khiew Hoe Yean	Malaysia	3:50.78	
25	6	8	Logan Fontaine	France	3:51.56	
26	4	4	Luke Turley	Great Britain	3:51.95	
27	4	0	Jovan Lekić	Bosnia and Herzegovina	3:53.17	
28	3	6	Joaquín Vargas	Peru	3:53.54	
29	3	2	Eduardo Cisternas	Chile	3:53.80	NR
30	3	5	Velimir Stjepanović	Serbia	3:54.25	
31	4	9	Glen Lim Jun Wei	Singapore	3:54.42	
32	6	9	Zac Reid	New Zealand	3:55.55	
33	5	9	Zhang Ziyang	China	3:55.76	
34	3	1	Tonnam Kanteemool	Thailand	3:56.69	
35	3	3	Kushagra Rawat	India	3:59.03	
36	3	4	Đỗ Ngọc Vĩnh	Vietnam	4:02.05	
37	3	7	Pavel Alovatki	Moldova	4:02.43	
38	3	0	Loris Bianchi	San Marino	4:03.88	
39	2	3	Sauod Al-Shamroukh	Kuwait	4:04.95	
40	2	8	Gerald Hernández	Nicaragua	4:05.13	NR
41	2	4	Alberto Vega	Costa Rica	4:05.18	
42	1	6	Raekwon Noel	Guyana	4:05.70	
43	2	5	Théo Druenne	Monaco	4:06.58	
44	1	4	Mal Gashi	Kosovo	4:07.65	
45	2	6	Nikola Ǵuretanoviḱ	North Macedonia	4:07.87	
46	2	0	Nasir Yahya Hussain	Nepal	4:08.23	NR
47	2	7	Líggjas Joensen	Faroe Islands	4:09.17	
48	2	9	Timothy Leberl	Mauritius	4:09.47	
49	2	1	Mauricio Arias	Dominican Republic	4:11.15	
50	1	5	Muhammad Siddiqui	Pakistan	4:12.29	NR
51	2	2	José Campo	El Salvador	4:15.97	
52	3	9	Dylan Cachia	Malta	4:16.27	
53	1	2	Ali Al-Awi	Bahrain	4:17.02	NR
54	1	3	Mohammed Al-Zaki	Saudi Arabia	4:20.48	
55	3	8	Mark Ducaj	Albania	4:20.88	

=== Final ===
The final was started at 20:02.

Rank	Lane	Name	Nationality	Time	Notes
1st place, gold medalist(s)	4	Samuel Short	Australia	3:40.68	
2nd place, silver medalist(s)	6	Ahmed Hafnaoui	Tunisia	3:40.70	AF
3rd place, bronze medalist(s)	2	Lukas Märtens	Germany	3:42.20	
4	3	Guilherme Costa	Brazil	3:43.58	
5	7	Kim Woo-min	South Korea	3:43.92	
6	8	Antonio Djakovic	Switzerland	3:44.22	
7	1	Elijah Winnington	Australia	3:44.26	
8	5	Felix Auböck	Austria	3:44.43	
