= Andela Antunović =

Montenegrin swimmer (born 2002)

Personal information
- Born: October 22, 2002 (age 23)

Sport
- Sport: Swimming

Andela Antunović (born October 22, 2002) is a Montenegrin swimmer competing in the 100 meter freestyle at the 2020 Summer Olympics. She competed in the 100 meter and 200 meter freestyle at the 2019 World Aquatics Championships.
