= Swimming at the 2020 Summer Olympics – Women's 100 metre freestyle =

Women's 100 metre freestyle at the Games of the XXXII Olympiad
- Venue: Tokyo Aquatics Centre
- Dates: 28 July 2021 (heats); 29 July 2021 (semifinals); 30 July 2021 (final)
- Competitors: 51 from 42 nations
- Winning time: 51.96 OR

Medalists
1st place, gold medalist(s)		Emma McKeon	Australia
2nd place, silver medalist(s)		Siobhán Haughey	Hong Kong
3rd place, bronze medalist(s)		Cate Campbell	Australia

The women's 100 metre freestyle event at the 2020 Summer Olympics was held from 28 to 30 July 2021 at the Tokyo Aquatics Centre. It was the event's twenty-fifth consecutive appearance, having been held at every edition since 1912.

== Summary ==
Australia's Emma McKeon became only the second woman to break the 52 second threshold in the event, setting a new Olympic and Oceanian record of 51.96. With the victory, McKeon won her first individual Olympic title and Australia's first in the event since Jodie Henry in 2004.

Though first at the 50, Hong Kong's Siobhan Haughey was overtaken by McKeon down the stretch but still won her second silver medal at these Games with an Asian record of 52.27. Australia's Cate Campbell, the resounding favourite for gold in 2016, had a comeback performance to take the bronze medal in 52.52. By joining teammate McKeon on the podium, the pair's 1-3 finish marked the first time two Australians placed on the podium in this event since the country's medal sweep in Melbourne 1956.

One of two defending champions Penny Oleksiak of Canada finished narrowly behind Campbell in a Canadian record of 52.57. Sweden's world-record holder and 2016 bronze medallist Sarah Sjöström was last at the 50 but managed to touch in 52.68 for fifth. Femke Heemskerk (52.79) clocked a new Dutch record to come sixth while Great Britain's Anna Hopkin (52.83) and the U.S.'s Abbey Weitzeil (53.23) rounded out the finalists.

The medals for the competition were presented by Sweden's Gunilla Lindberg, IOC member, and the gifts were presented by Uruguay's Julio Maglione, former FINA President.

== Records ==
Prior to this competition, the existing world and Olympic records were as follows.

World record	Sarah Sjöström (SWE)	51.71	Budapest, Hungary	23 July 2017
Olympic record	Simone Manuel (USA); Penny Oleksiak (CAN)	52.70	Rio de Janeiro, Brazil	11 August 2016

The following records were established during the competition:

Date	Event	Swimmer	Nation	Time	Record
July 25	Final*	Sarah Sjöström	Sweden	52.62	OR
July 28	Heat 6	Emma McKeon	Australia	52.13	OR
July 30	Final	Emma McKeon	Australia	51.96	OR

* Split from the 4 × 100 m freestyle relay

== Qualification ==
The Olympic Qualifying Time for the event is 54.38 seconds. Up to two swimmers per National Olympic Committee (NOC) can automatically qualify by swimming that time at an approved qualification event. The Olympic Selection Time is 56.01 seconds. Up to one swimmer per NOC meeting that time is eligible for selection, allocated by world ranking until the maximum quota for all swimming events is reached. NOCs without a female swimmer qualified in any event can also use their universality place.

== Competition format ==
The competition consists of three rounds: heats, semifinals, and a final. The swimmers with the best 16 times in the heats advance to the semifinals. The swimmers with the best 8 times in the semifinals advance to the final. Swim-offs are used as necessary to break ties for advancement to the next round.

== Schedule ==
All times are Japan Standard Time (UTC+9)

Date	Time	Round
28 July 2021	19:00	Heats
29 July 2021	10:53	Semifinals
30 July 2021	10:59	Final

== Results ==
=== Heats ===
The swimmers with the top 16 times, regardless of heat, advanced to the semifinals.

Rank	Heat	Lane	Swimmer	Nation	Time	Notes
1	6	4	Emma McKeon	Australia	52.13	Q, OR
2	6	5	Siobhán Haughey	Hong Kong	52.70	Q, AS
3	6	6	Anna Hopkin	Great Britain	52.75	Q, NR
4	7	4	Cate Campbell	Australia	52.80	Q
5	5	4	Sarah Sjöström	Sweden	52.91	Q
6	7	5	Penny Oleksiak	Canada	52.95	Q
7	5	2	Pernille Blume	Denmark	52.96	Q
8	7	6	Yang Junxuan	China	53.02	Q, WD
9	5	5	Femke Heemskerk	Netherlands	53.10	Q
10	7	1	Kayla Sanchez	Canada	53.12	Q, WD
11	5	3	Abbey Weitzeil	United States	53.21	Q
12	7	3	Michelle Coleman	Sweden	53.53	Q
13	5	1	Signe Bro	Denmark	53.54	Q
14	7	2	Freya Anderson	Great Britain	53.61	Q
15	5	6	Charlotte Bonnet	France	53.67	Q
16	6	2	Marie Wattel	France	53.71	QSO
16	6	3	Ranomi Kromowidjojo	Netherlands	53.71	QSO, WD
18	6	7	Erika Brown	United States	53.87	QSO
18	7	8	Wu Qingfeng	China	53.87	QSO
20	5	7	Maria Kameneva	ROC	53.92	
21	6	1	Barbora Seemanová	Czech Republic	53.98	
22	6	8	Andrea Murez	Israel	54.06	NR
23	4	8	Fanny Teijonsalo	Finland	54.69	
24	5	8	Janja Šegel	Slovenia	54.73	
25	4	5	Erin Gallagher	South Africa	54.75	
26	4	7	Maria Ugolkova	Switzerland	54.86	
27	4	4	Lidón Muñoz	Spain	54.97	
28	4	3	Anastasiya Shkurdai	Belarus	55.17	
29	3	4	Kalia Antoniou	Cyprus	55.38	
30	4	6	Larissa Oliveira	Brazil	55.53	
31	3	6	Anicka Delgado	Ecuador	55.56	NR
32	4	2	Julie Meynen	Luxembourg	55.69	
33	3	5	Farida Osman	Egypt	55.74	
34	3	7	Snæfríður Jórunnardóttir	Iceland	56.15	
35	3	1	Bianca Costea	Romania	56.35	
36	4	1	Quah Ting Wen	Singapore	56.36	
37	3	3	Ieva Maļuka	Latvia	56.39	
38	3	2	Miriam Sheehan	Puerto Rico	56.64	
39	3	8	Amel Melih	Algeria	56.65	
40	2	4	Mia Blaževska Eminova	North Macedonia	57.19	
41	2	3	Jillian Crooks	Cayman Islands	57.32	NR
42	2	5	Jenjira Srisa-Ard	Thailand	57.42	
43	2	7	Maria Schutzmeier	Nicaragua	57.94	NR
44	2	1	Colleen Furgeson	Marshall Islands	58.71	
45	2	2	Varsenik Manucharyan	Armenia	59.18	
46	2	6	Jeanne Boutbien	Senegal	59.27	
47	2	8	Catarina Sousa	Angola	59.35	
48	1	3	Abiola Ogunbanwo	Nigeria	59.74	NR
49	1	4	Andela Antunović	Montenegro	1:00.01	
50	1	5	Gaurika Singh	Nepal	1:00.11	
51	1	6	Mineri Gomez	Guam	1:04.00	
	7	7	Federica Pellegrini	Italy	DNS	

Swim-off

Rank	Lane	Swimmer	Nation	Time	Notes
1	4	Erika Brown	United States	53.51	Q
2	5	Wu Qingfeng	China	54.47	Q

=== Semifinals ===
The swimmers with the best 8 times, regardless of heat, advanced to the final.

Rank	Heat	Lane	Swimmer	Nation	Time	Notes
1	2	4	Emma McKeon	Australia	52.32	Q
2	1	4	Siobhán Haughey	Hong Kong	52.40	Q, AS
3	1	5	Cate Campbell	Australia	52.71	Q
4	2	3	Sarah Sjöström	Sweden	52.82	Q
5	1	3	Penny Oleksiak	Canada	52.86	Q
6	1	6	Femke Heemskerk	Netherlands	52.93	Q
7	2	2	Abbey Weitzeil	United States	52.99	Q
8	2	5	Anna Hopkin	Great Britain	53.11	Q
9	1	1	Marie Wattel	France	53.12	
10	2	6	Pernille Blume	Denmark	53.26	
11	1	7	Freya Anderson	Great Britain	53.53	
12	2	7	Signe Bro	Denmark	53.55	
13	2	8	Erika Brown	United States	53.58	
14	1	2	Michelle Coleman	Sweden	53.73	
15	2	1	Charlotte Bonnet	France	54.10	
16	1	8	Wu Qingfeng	China	54.86	

=== Final ===
Rank	Lane	Swimmer	Nation	Time	Notes
1st place, gold medalist(s)	4	Emma McKeon	Australia	51.96	OR, OC
2nd place, silver medalist(s)	5	Siobhán Haughey	Hong Kong	52.27	AS
3rd place, bronze medalist(s)	3	Cate Campbell	Australia	52.52	
4	2	Penny Oleksiak	Canada	52.59	NR
5	6	Sarah Sjöström	Sweden	52.68	
6	7	Femke Heemskerk	Netherlands	52.79	
7	8	Anna Hopkin	Great Britain	52.83	
8	1	Abbey Weitzeil	United States	53.23	
