= María Hernández (swimmer) =

Nicaraguan swimmer (born 2001)

María Gabriela Hernández
Personal information
- Born: 17 September 2001 (age 24)

Sport
- Sport: Swimming

María Gabriela Hernández (born 17 September 2001) is a Nicaraguan swimmer. She competed in the women's 100 metre freestyle event at the 2017 World Aquatics Championships.
