= Tisa Shakya =

Nepalese swimmer

Personal information
- Born: 4 February 2003 (age 23)

Sport
- Sport: Swimming
Medal record
Women's swimming
Representing Nepal
South Asian Games
Bronze medal – third place	2019 Kathmandu	200 m individual medley

Tisa Shakya (born 4 February 2003) is a Nepalese swimmer. She competed in the women's 100 metre breaststroke event at the 2017 World Aquatics Championships. In 2019, she won the bronze medal in the women's 200 m individual medley event at the 2019 South Asian Games held in Nepal.
