= Dalia Tórrez Zamora =

Nicaraguan swimmer (born 1990)

Personal information
- Born: March 29, 1990 (age 36) Managua, Nicaragua

Sport
- Sport: Swimming
- Strokes: Butterfly

Dalia Tórrez Zamora (born 29 March 1990) is a Nicaraguan swimmer who competes in the Women's 100 metre butterfly. At the 2012 Summer Olympics she finished 39th overall in the heats in the Women's 100 metre butterfly and failed to reach the final.
