= Alexander Shah =

Nepalese-Danish swimmer

Personal information
- Full name: Alexander Gadegaard Shah
- Nickname: Alex Shah
- National team: Nepal
- Citizenship: Nepalese
- Born: 29 October 2002 (age 23) Bangkok, Thailand
- Education: Fordham University

Sport
- Country: Nepal
- Sport: Swimming
- University team: Fordham University Swim & Dive

Alexander Gadegaard Shah (also known as Alex Shah born: 29 October 2002) is a Nepalese professional swimmer. He represented Nepal in 2020 Tokyo Olympics in the 100 meter freestyle. Shah was selected to the Olympics as a wild card qualifier. His father is Nepalese and mother is Danish. He is the brother of swimmer Sofia Shah.

== Participation ==
- World Junior Championships in 2017 in 50 m and 100 m freestyle at Indianapolis, US
