= Miguel Mena (swimmer) =

Nicaraguan swimmer (born 1997)

Miguel Ángel Mena
Personal information
- Born: 7 July 1997 (age 29) Managua, Nicaragua

Sport
- Sport: Swimming

Miguel Ángel Mena (born 7 July 1997) is a Nicaraguan swimmer. He competed in the men's 100 metre freestyle event at the 2016 Summer Olympics where he ranked 55th with a time of 53.40 seconds. He did not advance to the semifinals.

In 2019, he represented Nicaragua at the 2019 World Aquatics Championships held in Gwangju, South Korea and he finished in 78th place in the heats in the men's 50 metre freestyle event. In the men's 100 metre freestyle he finished in 75th place in the heats.
