= Sirish Gurung =

Nepalese swimmer

Personal information
- Full name: Sirish Gurung
- Nationality: Nepalese
- Born: 11 August 1998 (age 27) Kathmandu, Nepal
- Height: 5 ft 8 in (1.73 m)
- Weight: 68 kg (150 lb)

Sport
- Country: Nepal
- Sport: Swimming

Achievements and titles
- Olympic finals: Rio, 2016

Sirish Gurung (born 11 August 1998) is a Nepalese competitive swimmer. He competed at the 2016 Summer Olympics in Rio de Janeiro, in the men's 100 meter freestyle and set a new national record in the event. Gurung also won the Nepal Open Water Swimming Championship three consecutive times.

From an early age, the Kathmandu native has been a source of hope and pride for Nelap, partaking in a sport that Nepalis rarely compete in on the international level. Gurung has won several swimming championships, mastered 11 musical instruments, and learned to drive at an early age of five.

== Early life ==
Since childhood, Gurung had been described as a hyperactive free-spirit. His parents enrolled him in multiple extracurricular actives, which included swim lessons. At age 5, Gurung was award the Youngest Trp

As destined, his career as a swimmer kick-started when he won the trophy of the Youngest Swimmer at an age of 5. In 2008, when two of his seniors were selected for the Beijing Olympics. He says, "This incident gave me an insight that swimming is not only a game but also a matter of pride. I instantly made up my mind to represent Nepal in the Olympics near future. This is how I started taking my training seriously since then."

Eight years later, he represented Nepal in the Rio Olympics.

Gurung has always been fascinated by automobiles, and his parents did not object when he expressed an interest in driving. He could drive a vehicle, a truck, and a bike when he was six years old.
