= Duana Lama =

Nepalese swimmer

Personal information
- National team: Nepal
- Born: 14 July 2006 (age 20)

Sport
- Sport: Swimming
Medal record
Women's swimming
Representing Nepal
South Asian Games
Silver medal – second place	2019 Kathmandu-Pokhara	200 m breaststroke
Silver medal – second place	2019 Kathmandu-Pokhara	200 m butterfly
Bronze medal – third place	2019 Kathmandu-Pokhara	4×100 m freestyle
Bronze medal – third place	2019 Kathmandu-Pokhara	4×100 m medley

Duana Lama (born 14 July 2006) is a Nepalese swimmer who represented Nepal at the 2024 World Aquatics Championships and the 2024 Olympics.

== Early life and background ==
She was born in 2006 to a Nepalese father and an Irish mother. She is a student at the British International School, Phuket.

== Career ==
In the 2019 South Asian Games, she won two silver and two bronze medals.
