= María Schutzmeier =

Nicaraguan swimmer (born 1999)

Personal information
- Full name: María Victoria Schutzmeier
- Nationality: German, Nicaraguan
- Born: 29 October 1999 (age 26) Freising, Germany

Sport
- Country: Nicaragua
- Sport: Swimming

María Victoria Schutzmeier (born 29 October 1999) is a Nicaraguan swimmer. Born in Germany, she represents Nicaragua internationally. She competed at the 2020 and 2024 Summer Olympics and holds multiple Nicaraguan national records.

== Swimming career ==
Schutzmeier won a silver medal at the 2018 Central American and Caribbean Championships in the 50 metre butterfly. She competed in the 100 metre freestyle at the 2019 World Aquatics Championships and finished 51st in the heats. There, she also competed in the 50 metre butterfly, where she finished 40th in the heats.

At the 2021 Nicaraguan Championships, Schutzmeier set national records in the 50 and 100 metre backstroke, the 50 and 100 metre butterfly, and the 50 and 100 metre freestyle. She received a Universality place for the 2020 Summer Olympics in the 100 metre freestyle. She placed 43rd in the heats with a time of 57.94, breaking her own national record. After the Olympics, she competed at the 2021 World Short-Course Championships and finished 36th in the 50 metre butterfly and 45th in the 100 metre freestyle.

Schutzmeier finished 46th in the 50 metre freestyle and 41st in the 50 metre butterfly at the 2022 World Aquatics Championships. Then at the 2023 World Aquatics Championships, she finished 41st in the 50 metre butterfly and 38th in the 100 metre butterfly. She finished 16th in the 100 metre butterfly at the 2023 Pan American Games with a time of 1:02.33.

Schutzmeier earned a Universality place to represent Nicaragua at the 2024 Summer Olympics in the 100 metre butterfly with her result at the 2023 Pan American Games. She finished 30th in the heats with a time of 1:03.18. At the 2025 World Aquatics Championships, she finished 49th in the 50 metre butterfly and 44th in the 100 metre butterfly.

== Personal life ==
Schutzmeier was born in Germany, but her parents immigrated to Nicaragua when she was one year old. She moved back to Germany in 2018 to study at the Technical University of Dortmund.
