= Gaurika Singh =

Nepalese swimmer

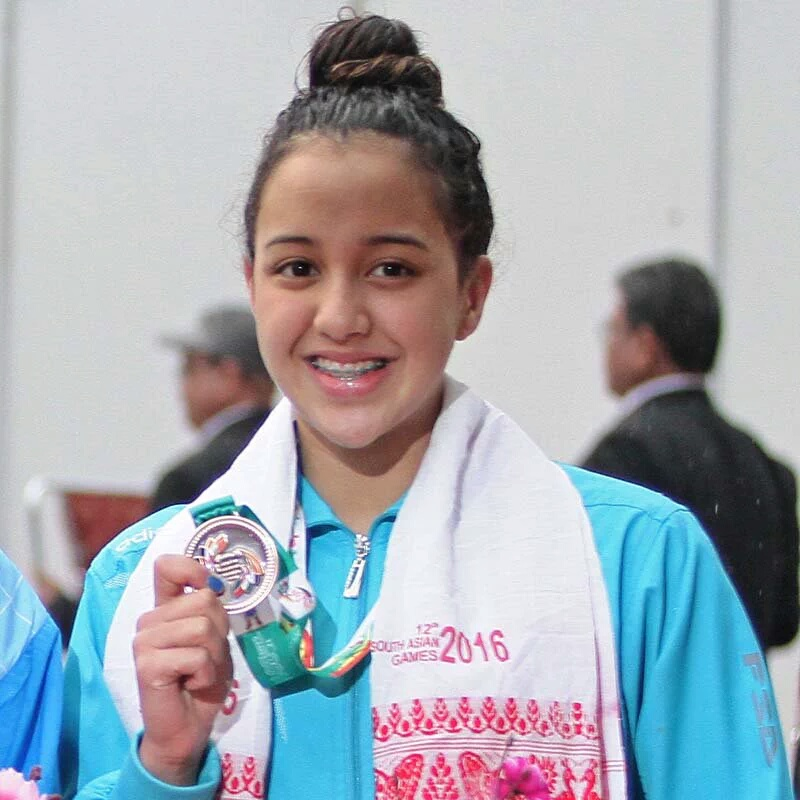
- Gaurika Singh After Receiving a Silver Medal at the 2016 South Asian Games

Personal information
- Full name: Gaurika Singh
- National team: Nepal
- Born: 26 November 2002 (age 23) Kathmandu, Nepal
- Height: 171 cm (5 ft 7 in)
- Weight: 58 kg (128 lb)

Sport
- Sport: Swimming
- Strokes: Freestyle, Backstroke, Breaststroke, Butterfly, Medley
- Club: Camden Swiss Cottage Swimming Club
- Coach: Adam Taylor
Medal record
Representing Nepal
South Asian Games
Gold medal – first place	2019 Kathmandu	100 m freestyle
Gold medal – first place	2019 Kathmandu	200 m freestyle
Gold medal – first place	2019 Kathmandu	400 m freestyle
Gold medal – first place	2019 Kathmandu	200 m backstroke
Silver medal – second place	2019 Kathmandu	50 m backstroke
Silver medal – second place	2019 Kathmandu	100 m backstroke
Silver medal – second place	2016 Guwahati	200 m medley
Bronze medal – third place	2019 Kathmandu	4×100 m freestyle
Bronze medal – third place	2019 Kathmandu	4×200 m freestyle
Bronze medal – third place	2019 Kathmandu	4×100 m medley
Bronze medal – third place	2016 Guwahati	100 m backstroke
Bronze medal – third place	2016 Guwahati	200 m backstroke
Bronze medal – third place	2016 Guwahati	400 m freestyle

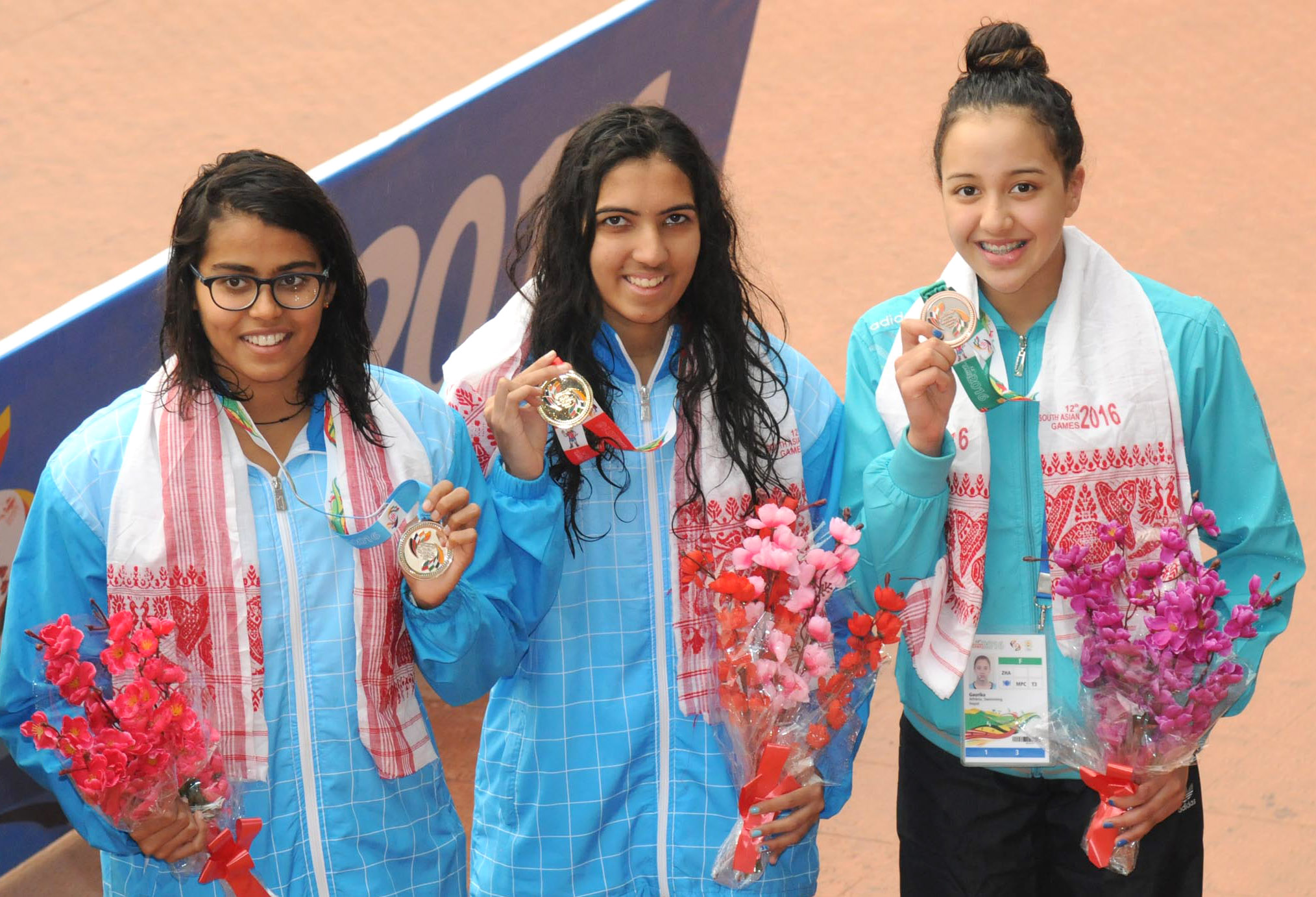
V. Malvika (INDIA) won gold medal, Shivani Kataria (INDIA) won silver medal and Gaurika Singh (NEPAL) won bronze medal, in the Women's swimming 400m Freestyle category, at the 12th South Asian Games-2016,

Gaurika Singh (Nepali: गौरिका सिंह; born 26 November 2002) is a Nepalese swimmer. She has held many national records since beginning her swimming career at the young age of eight. She has set the record of winning 4 gold medals in a season of the 2019 South Asian games held in Nepal. She won two silver and three bronze medals for swimming at the 2016 South Asian Games. She also participated at the 2016 Summer Olympics, Rio de Janeiro, Brazil, as the youngest Olympian, representing Nepal in the Women's 100m backstroke. She has been included in Forbes 30 Under 30 Asia 2021 Entertainment and Sports list.

== Personal life ==
Gaurika Singh originally hails from Bhimdutta municipality, Kanchanpur but now lives and trains in London, United Kingdom at the Camden Swiss Cottage Swimming Club under coach Adam Taylor, who has produced world-class swimmers. Singh is also currently the good-will ambassador of the Shanti Education Initiative Nepal (SEIN).

Singh's father, Paras Singh, often accompanies and supports her around the world.

Singh studied at Haberdashers' Girls' School and Belmont Mill Hill Preparatory School.

Singh is currently studying in Tufts University.

== Summer Olympics 2016 ==
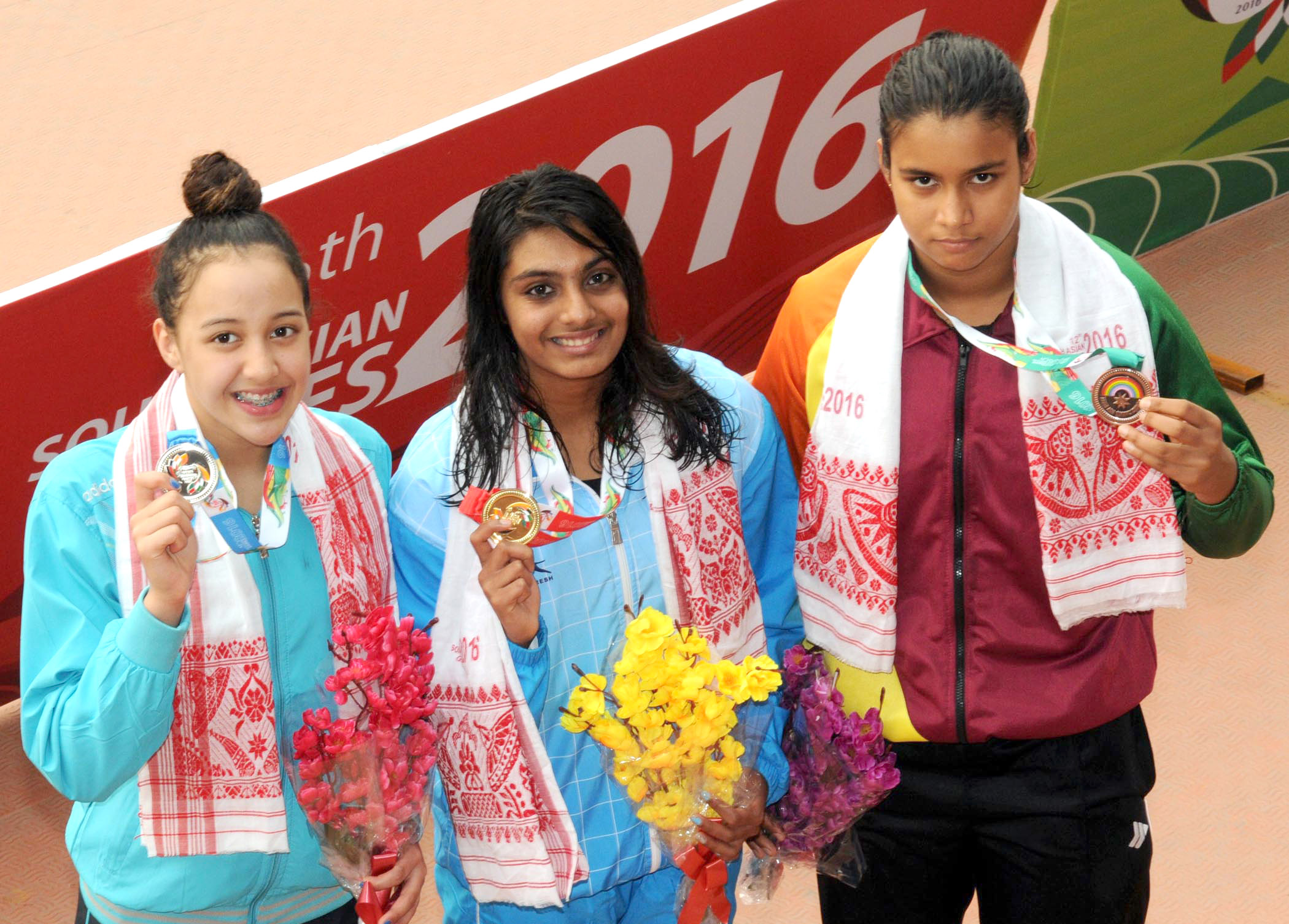
Shraddha Sudhir (INDIA) won gold medal, Gaurika Singh (NEPAL) won silver medal and Uthama Silva (SRI LANKA) won bronze medal in Women's 200m Medley Swimming, at the 12th South Asian Games-2016,

At 13 years and 255 days, Singh was the youngest athlete to compete at the 2016 Rio Olympics. She won heat 1 of the 100m Backstroke in a time of 1:08:45 but did not qualify for the semifinals. Singh finished in 31st place.

== Summer Olympics 2020 ==
At the age of 18 years 8 months 2 days, Singh competed at 2020 Tokyo Olympic. She secured 3rd position of heat 1 of the 100m Freestyle in a time of 1:00:11. Singh managed to set the national record but didn't qualify for semi-finals. Singh finished in 50th position.

== Achievements ==
Event	Time		Name	Club	Date	Meet	Location	Ref
Women's 100m freestyle	1:00:11	NR	Gaurika Singh	28 July 2021	2020 Summer Olympics	Tokyo, Japan		
Women's 200m free	2:05.06	NR	Gaurika Singh	December 2019	2019 South Asian Games	Kathmandu, Nepal		
Women's 100m backstroke	1:08.45		Gaurika Singh	August 2016	2016 Summer Olympics	Rio de Janeiro, Brazil		
Women's 100m free	1:01.78		Gaurika Singh	April 2016	2016 Irish Open Swimming Championships	Dublin, Ireland		
Women's 200 free	2:25.99	NR	Gaurika Singh	April 2016	2016 Irish Open Swimming Championships	Dublin, Ireland		
400m freestyle	4:40.93		Gaurika Singh	February 2016	2016 South Asian Games	Guwahati, India		
100m backstroke	1:07.31	NR	Gaurika Singh	February 2016	2016 South Asian Games	Guwahati, India		
200m backstroke	2:26.93		Gaurika Singh	February 2016	2016 South Asian Games	Guwahati, India		
200m individual medley	2:33.26	NR	Gaurika Singh	February 2016	2016 South Asian Games	Guwahati, India		
100m backstroke	1:08.91		Gaurika Singh	7 November 2015	2015 FINA Swimming World Cup	Dubai, United Arab Emirates		
100m backstroke	1:08.12	NR	Gaurika Singh	3 August 2015	2015 World Aquatics Championships	Kazan, Russia		
100m breaststroke	1:26.72	NR	Gaurika Singh	June 2015	2015 Open National and Age-group Swimming Championship	Lalitpur, Nepal, Nepal		
200m breastroke	2:37.87	NR	Gaurika Singh	June 2015	2015 Open National and Age-group Swimming Championship	Lalitpur, Nepal, Nepal		
100m freestyle	1:03.91	NR	Gaurika Singh	June 2015	2015 Open National and Age-group Swimming Championship	Lalitpur, Nepal, Nepal		
200m individual medley	2:53.57	NR	Gaurika Singh	July 2014	2014 Galaxy Cup	Lalitpur, Nepal, Nepal		
50m butterfly		NR	Gaurika Singh	July 2014	2014 Galaxy Cup	Lalitpur, Nepal, Nepal		
100m butterfly	1:19.34	NR	Gaurika Singh	July 2014	2014 Galaxy Cup	Lalitpur, Nepal, Nepal		
50m backstroke			Gaurika Singh	July 2014	2014 Galaxy Cup	Lalitpur, Nepal, Nepal		
100m backstroke	1:17.97	NR	Gaurika Singh	July 2014	2014 Galaxy Cup	Lalitpur, Nepal, Nepal		
200m backstroke		NR	Gaurika Singh	July 2014	2014 Galaxy Cup	Lalitpur, Nepal, Nepal		
200m freestyle	2:26.28	NR	Gaurika Singh	July 2014	2014 Galaxy Cup	Lalitpur, Nepal, Nepal		
