= Sofia Shah =

Nepalese swimmer

Personal information
- Full name: Sofia Gadegaard Shah
- National team: Nepal (2013–present)
- Born: 9 August 1997 (age 27); Copenhagen, Denmark
- Height: 5 ft 4 in (163 cm)
- Weight: 121 lb (55 kg)

Sport
- Sport: Swimming
- Strokes: Freestyle
- Club: Thanyapura

Sofia Gadegaard Shah (Nepali: सोफिया शाह; born 9 August 1997) is a Nepalese origin swimmer, who has represented Nepal since 2013. In 2014, she was nominated in the Popular Player of the Year category of the Pulsar Sports Awards.

== Early life and education ==
Shah was born in Copenhagen, Denmark, but was raised from a young age in Kathmandu, Nepal with her family. She has a Nepali father and Danish mother. Her brother Alexander is also a swimmer. She attended Lincoln School from 2000- to 2015 and swam for the high school SAISA team. Shah was awarded the U.S. Presidential Award for Outstanding Academic Achievement in 2009, 2010, 2011, 2012, 2013, 2014 and 2015. In May 2015, she was awarded a FINA one-year "Road to Rio" scholarship to train in Thanyapura Phuket, Thailand. Shah attended the College of William and Mary for her first year of college, and then transferred to Pepperdine University.

== Swimming career ==
Shah has won a total of 102 gold national medals, along with 35 silver and 22 bronze medals.

She competed in the 50 m and 200 m freestyle events at the 2013 World Aquatics Championships. Shah set a new national record in heat rounds of the women's 200 meter freestyle during the 16th FINA World Championship in Kazan, Russia. She finished in 60th place among 63 participants, completing the distance in 2 minutes 18.93 seconds.

Shah entered finals in all her events at the 12th South Asian Games 2016 in Guwahati, India. This was the first international meet in which she qualified for finals.

She has represented Nepal at:

1. 15th FINA World Championships 2013 - Barcelona, Spain
2. 4th FINA Junior World Championships 2013 - Dubai, U.A.E.
3. 17th Asian Games 2014 - Incheon, Korea
4. 12th FINA World Championships (25m) 2014 - Doha, Qatar
5. 16th FINA World Championships 2015 - Kazan, Russia
6. 8th Asian Age Group Swimming Championships 2015 - Bangkok, Thailand
7. FINA/Airweave Swimming World Cup 2015 - Dubai, U.A.E.
8. 12th South Asian Games 2016 - Guwahati, India
9. Thailand Age Group Swimming Championships 2016 - Bangkok, Thailand

== Personal records ==
| Event | Time | Competition |
|---|---|---|
| 50m Freestyle | 28.85 | 12th South Asian Games, India 2016 |
| 100m Freestyle | 1:02.10 | 12th South Asian Games, India 2016 |
| 200m Freestyle | 2:13.32 | 12th South Asian Games, India 2016 |
| 400m Freestyle | 4:53.93 | FINA/Airweave Swimming World Cup, Dubai 2015 |
| 400m Individual Medley | 5:47.69 | 12th South Asian Games, India 2016 |

Shah currently holds the Nepalese national records in the 50m freestyle, 200m freestyle and 400m Individual Medley.
