= Nicaragua at the 2011 World Aquatics Championships =

Sporting event delegation

Flag of Nicaragua

Nicaragua competed at the 2011 World Aquatics Championships in Shanghai, China between July 16 and 31, 2011.

== Swimming ==
Nicaragua qualified 3 swimmers.

Men

Athlete	Event	Heats		Semifinals		Final	
Athlete	Event	Time	Rank	Time	Rank	Time	Rank
Omar Núñez	Men's 100m Freestyle	56.76	80	did not advance			
Omar Núñez	Men's 1500m Freestyle	17:41.77	27			did not advance	

Women

Athlete	Event	Heats		Semifinals		Final	
Athlete	Event	Time	Rank	Time	Rank	Time	Rank
Fabiola Isabel Espinoza	Women's 50m Freestyle	28.18	48	did not advance			
Fabiola Isabel Espinoza	Women's 100m Freestyle	1:03.54	60	did not advance			
Dalia Torrez	Women's 50m Butterfly	29.67	37	did not advance			
Dalia Torrez	Women's 100m Butterfly	1:05.71	43	did not advance			
