= Nepal at the 2011 World Aquatics Championships =

Sporting event delegation

Flag of Nepal

Nepal competed at the 2011 World Aquatics Championships in Shanghai, China between July 16 and 31, 2011.

== Swimming ==
Nepal qualified 3 swimmers.

Men

Athlete	Event	Heats		Semifinals		Final	
Athlete	Event	Time	Rank	Time	Rank	Time	Rank
Prasiddha Jung Shah	Men's 50m Freestyle	27.30	82	did not advance			
Prasiddha Jung Shah	Men's 100m Freestyle	1:01.84	92	did not advance			
Shailesh Shumsher Rana	Men's 50m Freestyle	27.58	86	did not advance			
Shailesh Shumsher Rana	Men's 100m Freestyle	1:01.94	93	did not advance			

Women

Athlete	Event	Heats		Semifinals		Final	
Athlete	Event	Time	Rank	Time	Rank	Time	Rank
Shreya Dhital	Women's 50m Freestyle	32.44	72	did not advance			
Shreya Dhital	Women's 100m Freestyle	1:10.82	73	did not advance			
