= List of flag bearers for Bangladesh at the Olympics =

Bangladesh at the Olympics
- IOC code: BAN
- NOC: Bangladesh Olympic Association
- Website: www.nocban.org
- Medals: Gold 0 Silver 0 Bronze 0 Total 0

Summer appearances
- 1984; 1988; 1992; 1996; 2000; 2004; 2008; 2012; 2016; 2020; 2024

This is a list of flag bearers who have represented Bangladesh at the Olympics.

Flag bearers carry the national flag of their country at the opening ceremony of the Olympic Games.

#	Event year	Season	Flag bearer	Sport
1	1984	Summer	Saidur Rahman Dawn	Athletics
2	1988	Summer	Bazlur Mohamed Rahman	Swimming
3	1992	Summer		
4	1996	Summer	Saiful Alam	Shooting
5	2000	Summer	Sabrina Sultana	Shooting
6	2004	Summer	Asif Khan	Shooting
7	2008	Summer	Rubel Rana	Swimming
8	2012	Summer	Mahfizur Rahman Sagor	Swimming
9	2016	Summer	Siddikur Rahman	Golf
10	2020	Summer	Ariful Islam	Swimming
11	2024	Summer	Sagor Islam	Archery
11	2024	Summer	Sonia Khatun	Swimming

== See also ==
- Bangladesh at the Olympics
