= Sport in Bangladesh =

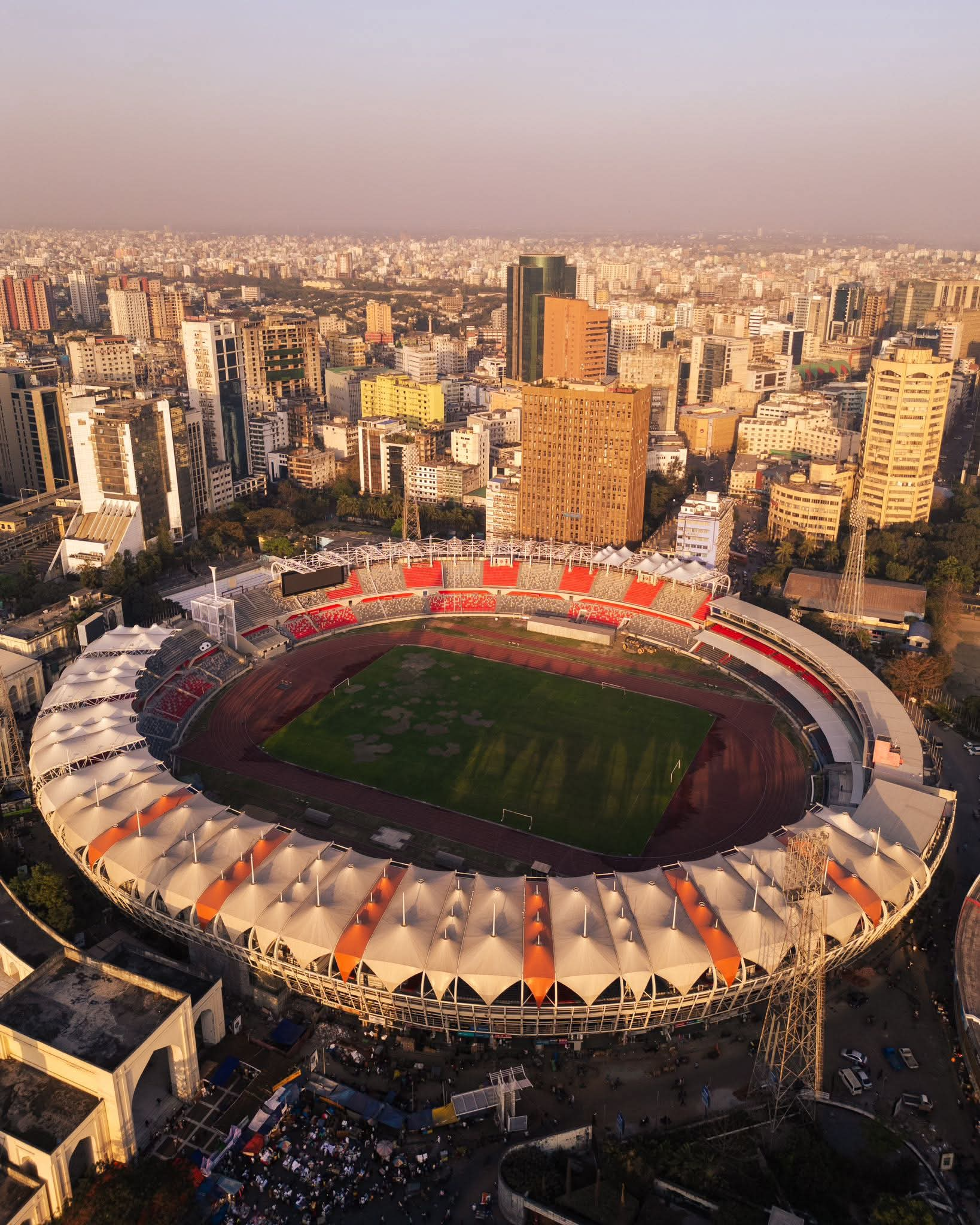
Bangladesh National Football Stadium

Sport in Bangladesh is a popular form of entertainment as well as an essential part of Bangladeshi culture. Cricket is the most popular sport in Bangladesh followed by football. Ha-Du-Du is the national sport of Bangladesh.

Bangladesh is one of the top 10 cricketing nations of the world and has regularly qualified for the Cricket World Cup since 1999, the country achieved arguably its greatest heights in Cricket, when it defeated three of the top-rated teams in 2015 Cricket World Cup to qualify for the quarterfinals. In 2015, they white-washed Pakistan and clinched the series by 3-0 and in another major achievement they won a series against India by 2-1 in the same year, they beat South Africa 2–1 in an ODI series and cemented their spot in Champions Trophy 2017.

In football, Bangladesh is only the second team from South Asia to have qualified for the AFC Asian Cup (1980). The country's greatest success in football was their 2003 SAFF Gold Cup triumph along with winning gold at the 1999 South Asian Games. The Shadhin Bangla football team was one of the first instances of a national sports team representing the country internationally, during their tour of India amidst the Bangladesh Liberation War.

The National Sports Council (NSC) is the governing body to controls all the sports federations and councils in the country and is responsible to the Ministry of Youth and Sports. There are a total of 46 different sports federations affiliated with the NSC. Bangladesh Games is the largest domestic multi-sport tournament in the country, where athletes and sports teams from all the districts participate.

== Major leagues ==
Leagues	Sports	Broadcaster(s)
Bangladesh Football League	Men's football	T Sports
Bangladesh Women's Football League	Women's football	T Sports
Bangladesh Premier League	Men's cricket	T Sports & GTV
Hockey Champions Trophy Bangladesh	Men's field hockey	T Sports

== Popular sports ==
=== Cricket ===
Cricket is the most popular sport in the country. Its popularity rose after the national team won the ICC Trophy in 1997 and for the first time qualified for the Cricket World Cup in 1999. In 2000, Bangladesh became a full member of International Cricket Council which allowed it to play Test cricket. Bangladesh regularly hosts many international One Day matches, Test matches, and Twenty20 Internationals. In 2011, Bangladesh hosted the 2011 Cricket World Cup along with India and Sri Lanka. Bangladesh was also elected to host the 2014 ICC World Twenty20. Bangladesh Cricket Board is the premier governing body to manage the development of the sport in the country.

In the 2015 ICC Cricket World Cup, Bangladesh beat England and reached the quarter-finals for the first time. However, they were knocked out in the quarter-final against India. Bangladesh also reached the semifinals of the ICC Champions Trophy in 2017, held in England and Wales, but lost to India again in the semis. The Bangladesh women's team beat India in the 2018 Asia Cup Finals to become only the second team after six-time winners India to lift the trophy.

On 9 February 2020, the Bangladesh Under-19 cricket team won the 2020 Under-19 Cricket World Cup held in South Africa after beating India in a nail-biting final. This was Bangladesh's first win in an ICC event at any level.

=== Football ===
Football is the second most popular sport in Bangladesh. The country's football legacy was even present during the Bangladesh Liberation War, through the rise of the Shadhin Bangla football team, who toured throughout India and played friendly matches to raise international awareness and economic support for the liberation war. From the 1970s to the 1990s, football was the most popular sport in the country. During the 2000s, its popularity gradually declined due to the rising influence of cricket. However, in the 2020s, football has been regaining popularity again. The Bangladesh Football Federation (BFF) is in charge of managing the sport in the country.

In 1976, Bangladesh became affiliated with FIFA. The mid-eighties saw a surge in support for the three traditional domestic giants Dhaka Mohammedan, Abahani Limited Dhaka and Brothers Union, who established massive fan bases all over the country. The most anticipated game in Bangladeshi domestic football is the Dhaka Derby and during the majority of the 80s, the derby was seen as the biggest sporting event in the country. Since independence, the country has hosted two major AFC tournaments, the 1978 AFC Youth Championship and the 2006 AFC Challenge Cup.

The national team's only appearance in the AFC Asian Cup to date was during the 1980 edition when they became only the second South Asian team to qualify for the main tournament. In 1995, the national team won the 4-nation Tiger Trophy in Myanmar, which was their first ever major trophy. Even after the decline of domestic football, there are more football tournaments organized in and outside Dhaka than any other sports, and football fever grips the nation during every FIFA World Cup.

In 2022, the women's team created history by winning the 2022 SAFF Women's Championship, defeating Nepal in the final.

For the first time in history, the Bangladesh women's national football team qualified for the 2026 AFC Women's Asian Cup finals in July 2025.

=== Hockey ===
Hockey has been one of the most popular sports in Bangladesh. It comes right after Cricket and football considering their popularity. However, the lack of responsible officials and maladministration has led this sport to decline as well. Bangladesh, even though, regularly participates in the Hockey Asia Cup and also hosted its edition in 1985. The Bangladesh Hockey Federation, the national governing body for the sport, every year organizes some domestic competitions in the country, most notably the Premier Division Hockey League. In 2022 Bangladesh started its first-ever franchise hockey league Hockey Champions Trophy Bangladesh.

=== Ha-du-du ===
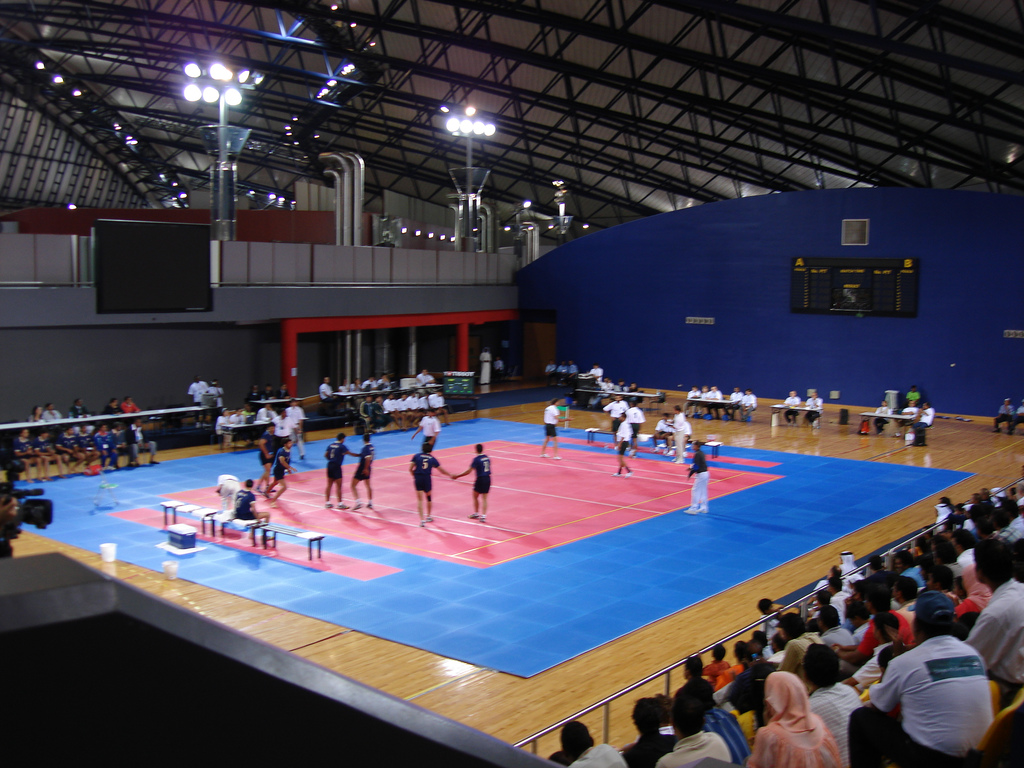
A Ha-du-du match at 2006 Asian Games.

Ha-du-du is recognized as the national sport in Bangladesh. The sport is played all through the country. Bangladesh has been regularly participating in Asian Games for Ha-du-du. However, the recent rise of other sports has led to a decline in their popularity. Bangladesh was once considered one of the top sides to play against in the world but has now been weakening due to a lack of funds and other reasons.

=== Chess ===
Chess is a popular indoor game in Bangladesh and the country has given birth to many talented chess players. Bangladeshi chess player Niaz Murshed is the first Grandmaster to emerge from South Asia in 1987. The Bangladesh Chess Federation has become a member of the FIDE in 1979. Every year it arranges some 15 to 20 tournaments at the national and international levels. The Bangladeshi Chess Championship is the annual individual national chess championship in the country.

== Other ball sports ==
=== Golf ===
Golf has recently seen an increase in its popularity in Bangladesh. The sport was not much notable until Siddikur Rahman became the first Bangladeshi golfer to win an Asian Tour event at the Brunei Open in 2010. Subsequently, the sport began to get enough media coverage in Bangladesh and also succeeded in acquiring sponsors to ensure its financial sufficiency.

=== Handball ===
The Bangladesh Handball Federation developed this sport in the country which has been a member of International Handball Federation since 1986. Both men's and women's teams from Bangladesh represent the nation in various international events most notably the South Asian Games. In addition, BHF, with assistance from the Ministry of Education, holds annual inter-school championships for both boys and girls throughout the country.

=== Volleyball ===
Volleyball is very popular in Bangladesh and practiced throughout the country but still struggles to have pleasant performances in the international arena. The Bangladesh Volleyball Federation was formed in 1972 and got its affiliation from Fédération Internationale de Volleyball and Asian Volleyball Confederation in 1976. So far, Bangladesh has participated twice in the Asian Games, twice in the Asian Youth Volleyball Championship, and thrice in the Asian Men's Volleyball Championship. Bangladesh Volleyball Team achieved the Runners-up Trophy of the International Volleyball Championships held in Pakistan from 28 to 30 January 2009. There are also annual inter-school and national championships for the sport.

=== Basketball ===
Basketball is a popular sport in Bangladesh mostly in the urban areas. The Bangladesh Basketball Federation has been affiliated with FIBA since 1978. Bangladesh has never qualified for Basketball at the Summer Olympics or the FIBA World Championship. The national team's best finish at the FIBA Asia Championship was 13th in 1979. The other notable achievement was winning a bronze at the 2010 South Asian Games.

=== Rugby ===
Rugby is a minor but rapidly growing sport in Bangladesh. The history of rugby in Bangladesh, however, dates back to the 19th century during the British rule, when the Europeans used to play the sport in Bangladesh. After the fall of the British dynasty, the sport had little or no presence in the country. However, in 2007, after a long period of dormancy, some Japanese coaches started a youth program. Various schools sent under-12s to the training camp. The Bangladesh Rugby Association, the national governing body for the sport has been training these children to start an inter-schools tournament. Bangladesh Rugby Association became Bangladesh Rugby Federation Union after getting affiliated with the Federation. Now, the Bangladesh Rugby Federation Union is a member of the Bangladesh Olympic Association, National Sports Council & Asia Rugby.

Bangladesh Rugby has especially been raised under the Current General Secretary Mr Mousum Ali. Besides, Bangladesh Rugby has specially stepped up after introducing a Rugby Development Team.

== Racquet sport ==
=== Squash ===
Recent measures taken by the government and officials of the Bangladesh Squash Racket Federation have resulted in the growth of the popularity of squash in Bangladesh. The Government has proposed to provide a land where the main Federation headquarters will be built. Grameenphone Open Squash Tournament is a major tournament in Bangladesh. Some promising squash players from Bangladesh include Swapan Parvez, Raju Ram, Iman, Tamim, Habbarter Ribhu etc.

=== Tennis ===
Tennis is mostly played in the urban areas of Bangladesh. The Grand Slam tournaments like the US Open, Wimbledon are very popular among the urban people. Still, so far nobody represented the country in a grand slam as very few take the sport professionally. Since 2008, the Bangladesh Tennis Federation has been holding an annual international junior tennis tournament to promote and develop the sport in the country.

Bangladesh Davis Cup team made its Davis Cup debut in 1986. Bangladesh succeeded in reaching the semi-finals three years later in Davis Cup 1989 in Asia/Oceania Zone Group II that was held in Singapore.

=== Table tennis ===
Table tennis has been played in Bangladesh since the 1950s. Although, the game is very popular in schools, colleges, and universities, tournaments outside educational institutions are not rare. The Bangladesh Table Tennis Federation was created in 1972. The same year, it became a member of the Asian and World Table Tennis Federations. Many national and international competitions are held by BTTF as well as some major sponsors.

Bangladesh takes part in different international table tennis tournaments and achieved some success too. In 1997, the Bangladesh boys' team got third place in the first junior competition among 12 countries of the SAARC and ASEAN regions. Bangladesh also won some medals in the South Asian Games. Bangladesh successfully hosted the Asian Cup Table Tennis Tournament in 1991. Bangladeshi table tennis player, Zobera Rahman Linu has won the national table tennis championships in the individual category 16 times, which is the most by any sportsperson in any country of the world.

== Individual sports ==
=== Cycling ===
The cycling community is getting bigger with time in Bangladesh. There are South Dhaka Cyclists "SDC", Bangladeshi Cyclists and many other Cycling organizations.

=== Swimming ===
Bangladesh is a riverine country, having more than 250 rivers flowing through it. Hence swimming has always been a part of the lives of Bangladeshis. Bangladesh has produced a legendary swimmer Brojen Das, who was the first Asian to swim across the English Channel, and the first person to cross it four times. He is also the only person outside the United Kingdom and Australia to win the title of King of the Channel, from the Channel Swimming Association.

=== Athletics ===
Bangladesh has been participating in the Olympics, Asian Games, and other multinational competitions for athletics but hasn't been pleased with its performance. Bangladeshi athletes have won some medals at the South Asian Games. The Bangladesh Athletics Federation is the national governing body for athletics. The sport of athletics is a collection of sporting events that involve competitive running, jumping, throwing, and walking. The most common types of athletics competitions are track and field, road running, cross-country running, and race walking.

=== Shooting ===
Shooting is a promising sport in Bangladesh. Two gold medals at the Commonwealth Games for Bangladesh came from Shooting. Bangladesh has also won many gold medals at the South Asian Games. Shooting in Bangladesh came to the spotlight when Asif Hossain Khan clinched the 10-meter air rifle gold medal in the Commonwealth Games in 2002 and repeated his success in the South Asian Games in 2004. The Bangladesh Shooting Sport Federation - BSSF is the governing body for shooting sport in Bangladesh. Now, the President of BSSF is Mr. Nazimuddin Chowdhury & Secretary General is Mr. Enthekhabul Hamid for 2020.

=== Archery ===
Archery is a new sport in Bangladesh. Archery was introduced in Bangladesh in 2000 and the Bangladesh Archery Federation was formed in 2001 and affiliated with the World Archery Federation in 2003. Having won some gold and silver medals at some multinational Archery championships, Emdadul Haque Milon and Ruman Shana are the most promising archers in Bangladesh.

== Combat sport ==
=== Boxing ===
Boxing is not very popular in Bangladesh. The Bangladesh Amateur Boxing Federation is the controlling board for boxing in Bangladesh. Most of the boxers in Bangladesh emerge from the Rajshahi and Jessore regions. Even though the performance of Bangladeshi boxers at the international level has been abysmal, the boxers have succeeded in winning some gold medals at the South Asian Games.

=== Butthan ===
Butthan is a Bangladeshi martial art and an approved combat Sport included by the National Sports Council (NSC) under Ministry of Youth & Sports, Bangladesh. Butthan is also a system of personal development to obtain body-mind balance. Its three main pillars are Sports, Self-defense, and Well-being. But that was founded by Grandmaster Mak Yuree Vajramunee who was selected as one of the top five Superhumans by the Discovery Channel scientists team. He has many years of training in 40 different martial arts styles.

=== Karate ===
Bangladesh has been taking part in various multinational competitions for Karate and has won a total of seven gold medals at the South Asian Games. In 2010, Bangladesh achieved the highest number of four gold medals from Karate among all sports events and secured first position in the 11th South Asian Games. In 2019, Bangladesh secured three gold medals ranking second after archery in the 13th South Asian Games. Md. Hasan Khan, Md Hossain Khan, and Syed Nuruzzaman secured the first gold medal and made history for Karate in the South Asian Games in 2010. The Bangladesh Karate Federation, the national governing body for Karate, holds some annual Karate championships to promote the sport. Bangladesh Karate-Do is the most famous among the karate training institutes in Bangladesh.

=== Taekwondo ===
The Bangladesh Taekwondo Federation was formed in 1996 and is affiliated with the World Taekwondo Federation. Bangladesh Taekwondo team achieved 2 Gold at Open International Taekwondo Championships-2009 held in Seoul from 18 to 22 August 2009. Bangladesh has also won some gold medals at the South Asian games.

== Motorsports ==
=== Touring Car & Formula Racing ===
Car racing is a growing sport in Bangladesh. Avik Anwar, Affan Sadat and Aiman Sadat are Bangladesh's best racers.

== National competition ==
=== Football ===
- Bangladesh Championship League
- Bangladesh Premier League
- Dhaka Senior Division Football League
- Dhaka Second Division Football League
- Dhaka Third Division Football League
- Pioneer Football League
- Federation Cup (Bangladesh)
- Independence Cup (Bangladesh)
- National Football Championship
- Super Cup (Bangladesh)
- Bangladesh Women's League

=== Cricket ===
- National Cricket League of Bangladesh
- Dhaka Premier League T20
- Dhaka Premier League List A
- Bangladesh Premier League
- Women's National Cricket League
- Women's Dhaka Premier League

=== Hockey ===
- Hockey Champions Trophy Bangladesh
- Dhaka Premier Division Hockey League

=== Rugby union ===
- Victory Day Rugby Tournament
- Women's National Rugby Tournament

=== Volleyball ===
- Victory Day Volleyball Championship
- Independence Cup Volleyball Championship

== See also ==
- Bengali traditional games
