= Bangladesh at the 1996 Summer Olympics =

- IOC code: BAN
- NOC: Bangladesh Olympic Association
- Website: www.nocban.org

in Atlanta
- Competitors: 4 (3 men, 1 woman) in 3 sports
- Flag bearer: Saiful Alam
- Medals: Gold 0 Silver 0 Bronze 0 Total 0

Summer Olympics appearances (overview)
- 1984; 1988; 1992; 1996; 2000; 2004; 2008; 2012; 2016; 2020; 2024

Bangladesh was represented at the 1996 Summer Olympics in Atlanta, Georgia, United States by the Bangladesh Olympic Association.

In total, four athletes including three men and one woman represented Bangladesh in three different sports including athletics, shooting and swimming.

== Competitors ==
In total, four athletes represented Bangladesh at the 1996 Summer Olympics in Atlanta, Georgia, United States across three different sports.

Sport	Men	Women	Total
Athletics	1	1	2
Shooting	1	0	1
Swimming	1	0	1
Total	3	1	4

== Athletics ==
In total, two Bangladeshi athletes participated in the athletics events – Bimal Tarafdar in the men's 100 m and Nilufar Yasmin in the women's long Jump.

The heats for the men's 100 m took place on 26 July 1996. Tarafdar finished seventh in his heat in a time of 10.98 seconds. He failed to advance to the quarter-finals.

Qualifying for the women's long jump took place on 1 August 1996. On her first attempt, Yasmin jumped 5.19 m. She did not improve on her second attempt (4.65 m) but her third attempt was her best at 5.24 m. She did not advance to the finals and finished 36th overall.

Track events

Athlete	Event	Heat		Quarterfinal		Semifinal		Final	
Athlete	Event	Result	Rank	Result	Rank	Result	Rank	Result	Rank
Bimal Tarafdar	Men's 100 m	10.98	7	Did not advance					

Field Events

Athlete	Event	Qualification		Final	
Athlete	Event	Distance	Position	Distance	Position
Nilufar Yasmin	Women's long Jump	5.24	36	Did not advance	

== Shooting ==
In total, one Bangladeshi athlete participated in the shooting events – Saiful Alam in the men's 10 m air rifle.

The men's 10 m air rifle took place on 22 July 1996. Alam scored 581 points in the preliminary round. He did not advance to the final round and finished joint 33rd overall.

Athlete	Event	Qualification		Final	
Athlete	Event	Points	Rank	Points	Rank
Saiful Alam	10 m air rifle	581	33	Did not advance	

== Swimming ==
In total, one Bangladeshi athlete participated in the swimming events – Karar Rahman in the men's 100 m breaststroke.

The heats for the men's 100 m breaststroke took place on 20 July 1996. Rahman finished fourth in his heat in a time of one minute 11.47 seconds which was ultimately not fast enough to qualify for the finals.

Athlete	Events	Heat		Final	
Athlete	Events	Time	Position	Time	Position
Karar Rahman	100 m breaststroke	1:11.47	44	Did not advance	
