= Bangladesh at the 1988 Summer Olympics =

- IOC code: BAN
- NOC: Bangladesh Olympic Association

in Seoul
- Competitors: 6 in 2 sports
- Flag bearer: Bazlur Mohamed Rahman
- Medals: Gold 0 Silver 0 Bronze 0 Total 0

Summer Olympics appearances (overview)
- 1984; 1988; 1992; 1996; 2000; 2004; 2008; 2012; 2016; 2020; 2024; 2028

Other related appearances
- India (1900–pres.); Pakistan (1948–pres.)

Bangladesh competed at the 1988 Summer Olympics in Seoul, South Korea.

== Competitors ==
The following is the list of number of competitors in the Games.

Sport	Men	Women	Total
Athletics	4	0	4
Swimming	2	0	2
Total	6	0	6

== Athletics ==
=== Men ===
==== Track events ====
Athlete	Events	Heat		Semifinal		Final	
Athlete	Events	Time	Position	Time	Position	Time	Position
Milzer Hossain	400 m	48.76	58	Did not advance			
Milzer Hossain	800 m	1:51.16	49	Did not advance			
Shah Alam	200 m	22.52	65	Did not advance			
Shah Jalal (Note: also competed at the 1992 Summer Olympics)	100 m	10.94	79	Did not advance			
Shah Alam; Shahanud Chowdhury; Milzer Hossain; Shah Jalal	4 × 100 m relay	41.78	25	Did not advance			

==== Field events ====
Athlete	Event	Qualifying		Final	
Athlete	Event	Distance	Position	Distance	Position
Shahanud Chowdhury	Long Jump	X	34	Did not advance	

== Swimming ==
=== Men ===
Athlete	Events	Heat		Semifinal		Final	
Athlete	Events	Time	Position	Time	Position	Time	Position
Mohamed Bazlur Rahman	100m Breaststroke	1:14.97	58	Did not advance			
Mohamed Abdus Salam	100m Butterfly	1:03.69	48	Did not advance			
