= Faruqul Islam =

Faruqul Islam is a Bangladeshi sports organizer and retired civil servant. He is the national director of Special Olympics Bangladesh. He is the vice-president of Bangladesh Athletics Federation. He is the secretary general of the Bangladesh Institute of Sports Sciences.

== Early life ==
Islam studied at the Muslim Education Society High School and Graduates High School, Wari. He has a double masters in psychology and library sciences from the University of Dhaka.

== Career ==
From 1997 to 2001, Islam was the treasurer of the South Asian Athletics Federation.

In May 2004, Islam led teams of under 19, under 18, and under 14 of Bangladesh Krira Shikkha Protishtan to India to play against the DAV Senior Secondary School in Chandigarh.

Islam was the director of 5th International Junior Tennis Competition at the National Tennis Complex, which was organized by the Bangladesh Krira Shikkha Protisthan. In September 2007, Islam presided over a meeting of the Bangladesh Krira Shikkha Protishtan as Director with the newly formed selection board of Bangladesh Football Federation.

In 2009, Islam led the Bangladesh Institute of Sports Sciences to organize the 2009 Team Physician and Sports Physiotherapy courses.

In 2011, Islam was the General secretary of the Bangladesh Institute of Sports Sciences. He supervised the third Sports Medical Science Courses held in December at the Bangabandhu Sheikh Mujibur Rahman Medical University. Islam, as the national director of Special Olympics Bangladesh, led the 56 member Bangladeshi delegation to the 2011 Special Olympics World Summer Games in Greece.

In 2012, Islam oversaw the Special Olympics 5-a-side Football Tournament, with teams from Bangladesh, India, Nepal, and Pakistan, held at Bangladesh Army Stadium and inaugurated by Prime Minister Sheikh Hasina. He organized a talent hunt for Special Olympics Bangladesh in Chittagong.

Islam, as the national director of Special Olympics Bangladesh, led the Bangladeshi delegation to the 2015 Special Olympics World Summer Games. The Bangladeshi delegation, with 80 members including 20 coaches, won 18 gold medals, 22 Silver medals, and 14 bronze medals. The team was hosted by the Ismaili Muslim community in Los Angeles for which Islam thanked the volunteers of the Ismaili community and the Aga Khan Council. Islam told The Daily Star that more medals could have been won if the quota for Bangladeshi athletes were not reduced.

Islam was the head of the management committee of Piyar Sattar Latif High School in Kallyandi in 2016 whose headmaster, Shyamal Kanti Bhakta, was humiliated by local member of parliament Selim Osman. The management committee later suspended headmaster Shyamal Kanti Bhakta while Selim Osman demanded the Upazila Nirbahi Officer to terminate Islam. The school management committee was later disbanded.

Islam received the Bangladesh delegation to the 2017 Special Olympics World Winter Games on their return to Dhaka at the airport. In July, he was the chief guest at sports event for autistic children in Kishoreganj District organized by the District Sports Office of the Ministry of Youth and Sports.

In July 2018, Islam led a Bangladeshi delegation to the 50th anniversary of the International Special Olympics in Chicago during which an autistic athlete of the delegation went missing in Chicago.

Islam was part of the Bangladesh delegation to the 2019 Special Olympics World Summer Games in Abu Dhabi. Mutual Trust Bank Limited gave a reception to the delegation on their return to Dhaka.

In 2020, Islam dedicated the 43rd National Athletics Championship to former President Sheikh Mujibur Rahman. He made the announcement at the Bangabandhu National Stadium. He organized the 43rd Chattogram City Corporation National Athletics Championship in Chittagong. Islam and Azharul Islam Khan established the Super Star Body Building Gym in Kishoreganj District.

In August, Islam, national director of Special Olympics Bangladesh, organized training for kids with autism in Netrokona District inaugurated by Kamrunnesa Ashraf Dina. Islam, vice-president of Bangladesh Athletics Federation, conducted a Health Messenger & Athlete Leadership Program on 7 September 2022. Islam presided over the award ceremony of the Bangabandhu Victory Day National Marathon. He spoke to the New Age about the difficulty of special Olympic athletes to finance their activities and finding jobs.

In 2023, Islam was the convenor of the competition organizing committee of the Sheikh Kamal Inter: School and Madrasa Athletics competition, named after Sheikh Kamal. Islam admitted failure of the Bangladesh Athletics Federation in providing a house to the family of Shah Alam which was promised by the government of Bangladesh 32 years ago.
