= Bangladesh at the 2024 Summer Paralympics =

- Flag of Bangladesh
- IPC code: BAN
- NPC: National Paralympic Committee of Bangladesh

in Paris, France August 28, 2024 – September 8, 2024
- Competitors: 2 (1 man and 1 woman) in 1 sport
- Flag bearers: Joma Akter; Al Amin Hossain
- Medals: Gold 0 Silver 0 Bronze 0 Total 0

Summer Paralympics appearances (overview)
- 2004; 2008; 2012–2020; 2024

Bangladesh competed at the 2024 Summer Paralympics in Paris, France, from 28 August to 8 September.

== Competitors ==
The following is the list of number of competitors in the Games.

Sport	Men	Women	Total
Archery	1	1	2
Total	1	1	2

== Archery ==
Bangladesh earned two quotas: the first among them by 2024 Final World Quota Tournament, the second by bipartite commission.

Athlete	Event	Ranking Round		Round of 32	Round of 16	Quarterfinals	Semifinals	Finals	
Athlete	Event	Score	Seed	Opposition Score	Opposition Score	Opposition Score	Opposition Score	Opposition Score	Rank
Al Amin Hossain	Men's individual recurve	580	26	Molina (MEX); L 1–7	Did not advance				
Joma Akter	Women's individual compound open	658	20	Markitantova (POL); L 138(10)-138(10+)	Did not advance				

== See also ==
- Bangladesh at the 2024 Summer Olympics
- Bangladesh at the Paralympics
