= Saidur Rahman Dawn =

Bangladeshi sprinter (born 1963)

Personal information
- Nationality: Bangladeshi
- Born: 18 January 1963 (age 63)

Sport
- Sport: Sprinting
- Event: 100 metres

Saidur Rahman Dawn (born 18 January 1963) is a Bangladeshi sprinter. Self-taught, Dawn came to be regarded as "the fastest man in Bangladesh" and was sponsored to represent the country at the 1984 Summer Olympics. The nation's flagbearer in the opening ceremonies, he did not progress from the heats of the men's 100 and 200 metres races.

== Biography ==
Saidur Rahman Dawn was born on 18 January 1963 in Bangladesh. He was born into a family of five children, his father was a government worker. Before Dawn had a coach and had enrolled in college, he trained on a grass field near his childhood home. He would measure out a distance of 100 or 200 metres and ask for his friends to record his time. He trained by himself without a coach. It was not until he was sixteen years old that he obtained his first pair of track spikes, the following year he was coached for the first time. He first ran on a synthetic athletics track when he was nineteen.

Prior to the 1984 Summer Olympics in Los Angeles, United States, he was a psychology student and lived in Rajshahi. The Bangladesh Olympic Association had received $5750 from the International Olympic Committee to fund equipment, housing, and flights to the Summer Games. Dawn was invited to be the only athlete for Bangladesh at the 1984 Summer Olympics as he was known as the "fastest man in Bangladesh", becoming the first Bangladeshi athlete to compete at an Olympic Games. At the Summer Games, he was designated as the nation's flagbearer for the opening ceremony. His goal was to qualify for at least a semi-final finish in an event he had entered.

He first competed in the heats of the men's 100 metres on 3 August. Dawn ran in a time of 11.25 seconds in the eighth heat and placed last in his heat of eight competitors, citing he had "tangled" his legs after running the first 80 metres of the race. He then competed in the heats of the men's 200 metres three days later against eight other athletes. He ran in a time of 22.59 seconds and placed seventh in his heat, not advancing further. On the last week of the Games, the Bangladeshi delegation visited Disneyland, Knott's Berry Farm, and Universal Studios Hollywood.
