= Bangladesh at the 2016 Summer Olympics =

- IOC code: BAN
- NOC: Bangladesh Olympic Association
- Website: www.nocban.org

in Rio de Janeiro
- Competitors: 7 in 5 sports
- Flag bearer: Siddikur Rahman
- Medals: Gold 0 Silver 0 Bronze 0 Total 0

Summer Olympics appearances (overview)
- 1984; 1988; 1992; 1996; 2000; 2004; 2008; 2012; 2016; 2020; 2024

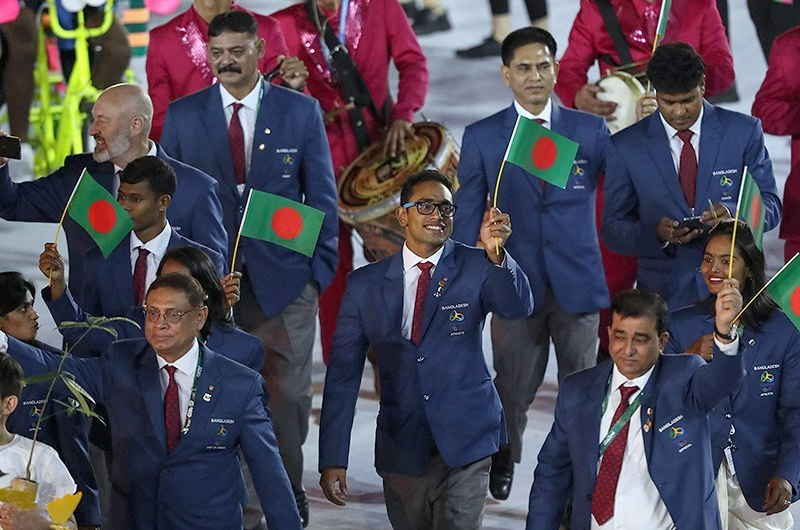
Bangladesh at the 2016 Summer Olympics opening ceremony.

Bangladesh competed at the 2016 Summer Olympics in Rio de Janeiro, Brazil, from 5 to 21 August 2016. This was the nation's ninth consecutive appearance at the Summer Olympics.

The Bangladesh Olympic Association selected a team of seven athletes, four men and three women, for the Games, competing in five different sports (archery, athletics, golf, shooting, and swimming). Six of them made their Olympic debut, with freestyle swimmer Mahfizur Rahman Sagor returning for his second Olympic appearance from London 2012. Majority of the roster received their spots by wild card entries or Tripartite invitations, without having qualified. Meanwhile, golfer Siddikur Rahman, the only qualified sportsman of the team, was selected to carry the Bangladeshi flag in the opening ceremony. Bangladesh, however, has yet to win an Olympic medal.

== Archery ==
Bangladesh received an invitation from the Tripartite Commission to send a female archer to the Olympic tournament.

Athlete	Event	Ranking round		Round of 64	Round of 32	Round of 16	Quarterfinals	Semifinals	Final / BM	
Athlete	Event	Score	Seed	Opposition Score	Opposition Score	Opposition Score	Opposition Score	Opposition Score	Opposition Score	Rank
Shamoli Ray	Women's individual	600	53	Bayardo (MEX); L 0–6	Did not advance					

== Athletics ==
Bangladesh received universality slots from IAAF to send two athletes (one male and one female) to the Olympics.

Key

- Note–Ranks given for track events are within the athlete's heat only
- Q = Qualified for the next round
- q = Qualified for the next round as a fastest loser or, in field events, by position without achieving the qualifying target
- NR = National record
- N/A = Round not applicable for the event
- Bye = Athlete not required to compete in round

Track & road events

Athlete	Event	Heat		Quarterfinal		Semifinal		Final	
Athlete	Event	Time	Rank	Time	Rank	Time	Rank	Time	Rank
Masbah Ahmmed	Men's 100 m	11.34	4	Did not advance					
Shirin Akter	Women's 100 m	12.99	5	Did not advance					

== Golf ==
Bangladesh entered one golfer into the Olympic tournament. Siddikur Rahman (world no. 308) qualified directly among the top 60 eligible players for the men's singles based on the IGF World Rankings as of 11 July 2016. Rahman is the first Bangladeshi to qualify for any Olympic Games in his own right, rather than relying on wild cards, tripartite commission entries or universality places.

Athlete	Event	Round 1	Round 2	Round 3	Round 4	Total		
Athlete	Event	Score	Score	Score	Score	Score	Par	Rank
Siddikur Rahman	Men's	75	70	75	75	295	+11	58

== Shooting ==
Bangladesh received an invitation from the Tripartite Commission to send a men's 10 m air rifle shooter to the Olympics.

Athlete	Event	Qualification		Final	
Athlete	Event	Points	Rank	Points	Rank
Abdullah Hel Baki	Men's 10 m air rifle	621.2	25	Did not advance	

Qualification Legend: Q = Qualify for the next round; q = Qualify for the bronze medal (shotgun)

== Swimming ==
Bangladesh received a Universality invitation from FINA to send two swimmers (one male and one female) to the Olympics.

Athlete	Event	Heat		Semifinal		Final	
Athlete	Event	Time	Rank	Time	Rank	Time	Rank
Mahfizur Rahman Sagor	Men's 50 m freestyle	23.92	54	Did not advance			
Sonia Aktar	Women's 50 m freestyle	29.99	69	Did not advance			
