= Bangladesh Fencing Association =

Sports governing body

- Abbreviation: BFA
- Formation: 2007
- Headquarters: Dhaka, Bangladesh
- Region served: Bangladesh
- Official language: Bengali
- Website: https://fencingbangladesh.org/

Bangladesh Fencing Association is the national governing body of Fencing in Bangladesh. It is affiliated with the Bangladesh Olympic Association and the International Fencing Federation.

== History ==
Bangladesh Fencing Association was established in 2007. The president was Lieutenant General A. T. M. Zahirul Alam and the general secretary was Major Qamrul Islam. The first participants were from Bangladesh Ansar and Village Defence Party Club.

President of the association, A. T. M. Zahirul Alam led the 23 member delegation of Bangladesh to the Rio Olympics in 2016.

In September 2017, Shoeb Chowdhury was appointed President of Bangladesh Fencing Association; he was serving as the vice-president of the association. Sheob is the chairman of Daily Asian Age and a director of Special Olympics Bangladesh.

National Sports Council made an ad-hoc committee for the Bangladesh Fencing Association with 27 members on 12 August 2021. Shoeb Chowdhury was the president and Selim Omrao Khan was the general secretary of the association. They met the State Minister for Youth and Sports, Zahid Ahsan Russell, to inform him about the activities of the Bangladesh Fencing Association.

Fencing association became a Federation since 2022 and as so far National sports council made a new ad-hoc committee for Bangladesh fencing Federation with new members where the president is Md Major Qumrul Islam(retd) and general secretary is Md Basunia M Ashiqul Islam.

In March 2022, the Bangladesh Fencing Association held the 4th Bangabandhu Independence Cup Fencing Competition at Shaheed Sohrawardi Indoor Stadium which was won by a team from Bangladesh Navy. It held the Bangabandhu 7th President Cup Fencing Championship in November.

In March 2023, the Bangladesh Fencing Association held the 5th Sheikh Kamal National Fencing Competition at the Shaheed Suhrawardi Indoor Stadium at Mirpur.
