= Bangladesh at the 2012 Summer Olympics =

- IOC code: BAN
- NOC: Bangladesh Olympic Association
- Website: www.nocban.org

in London
- Competitors: 5 in 5 sports
- Flag bearer: Mahfizur Rahman Sagor
- Medals: Gold 0 Silver 0 Bronze 0 Total 0

Summer Olympics appearances (overview)
- 1984; 1988; 1992; 1996; 2000; 2004; 2008; 2012; 2016; 2020; 2024; 2028

Other related appearances
- India (1900–pres.); Pakistan (1948–pres.)

Bangladesh competed at the 2012 Summer Olympics in London from 27 July to 12 August 2012. This was the nation's eighth consecutive appearance at the Summer Olympics.

Five Bangladeshi athletes were selected to the team, 4 men and 1 woman, representing the nation in five sporting disciplines: archery, athletics, gymnastics, shooting, and swimming. All of them were received under University places and by a tripartite invitation, without having qualified. Bangladesh, however, has yet to win an Olympic medal.

== Archery ==
Athlete	Event	Ranking round		Round of 64	Round of 32	Round of 16	Quarterfinals	Semifinals	Final	
Athlete	Event	Score	Seed	Opposition Score	Opposition Score	Opposition Score	Opposition Score	Opposition Score	Opposition Score	Rank
Mohammed Milon	Men's individual	636	61	Godfrey (GBR) (4); L 0–6	Did not advance					

== Athletics ==
Bangladesh has been given a wild card.

Key

- Note – Ranks given for track events are within the athlete's heat only
- Q = Qualified for the next round
- q = Qualified for the next round as a fastest loser or, in field events, by position without achieving the qualifying target
- NR = National record
- N/A = Round not applicable for the event
- Bye = Athlete not required to compete in round

Men

Athlete	Event	Heat		Quarterfinal		Semifinal		Final	
Athlete	Event	Result	Rank	Result	Rank	Result	Rank	Result	Rank
Mohan Khan	100 m	11.25	5	Did not advance					

== Gymnastics ==
Bangladesh has been awarded a wild card.

=== Artistic ===
Men

Athlete	Event	Qualification								Final							
Athlete	Event	Apparatus						Total	Rank	Apparatus						Total	Rank
Athlete	Event	F	PH	R	V	PB	HB	Total	Rank	F	PH	R	V	PB	HB	Total	Rank
Syque Caesar	Floor	14.666	—N/a					14.666	29	Did not advance							
Syque Caesar	Parallel bars	—N/a				14.766	—N/a	14.766	27	Did not advance							
Syque Caesar	Horizontal bar	—N/a					13.700	13.700	50	Did not advance							

== Shooting ==
Women

Athlete	Event	Qualification		Final	
Athlete	Event	Points	Rank	Points	Rank
Sharmin Ratna	10 m air rifle	393	27	Did not advance	

== Swimming ==
Bangladesh has been given a wildcard place for swimming

Men

Athlete	Event	Heat		Semifinal		Final	
Athlete	Event	Time	Rank	Time	Rank	Time	Rank
Mahfizur Rahman Sagor	50 m freestyle	24.64	39	Did not advance			
