= Abu Momtaz Saad Uddin Ahmed =

Abu Momtaz Saad Uddin Ahmed, also known as Kislu, is an additional secretary of the Ministry of Home Affairs and a member of the Police Reform Commission of the Muhammad Yunus-led interim government. He taught at the Bangladesh Public Administration Training Center.

== Early life ==
Ahmed was born in Badiul Alam Hat, North Madarsha, Hathazari Upazila, Chittagong District and grew up in Azimpur Colony. His father was a civil servant. He had 12 siblings including Farzana Mumtaz who joined the civil service with him. He studied at the West End High School. While studying at the University of Dhaka he taught at Dhaka City College.

== Career ==
From 1977 to 1995, Ahmed played table tennis professionally under the name Kislu. He is a National Table Tennis Champion. He is an executive member of Bangladesh Table Tennis Federation.

Ahmed worked at the Bangladesh Rural Electrification Board in 1981.

Ahmed joined the Bangladesh Civil Service in 1995 as part of the 15th batch.

Ahmed was the Member Directing Staff of the Bangladesh Public Administration Training Center. He was the Project Director with the rank of an Additional Secretary of the ASSET Project financed by the World Bank. He was the deputy chief of Health Economics Unit.

Ahmed wrote Accelerating and Strengthening Skills for Economic Transformation - Procurement Plan for the World Bank.

After the fall of the Sheikh Hasina led Awami League government, Ahmed was appointed Additional Secretary of the Public Security Division of the Ministry of Home Affairs. He was appointed member of the Police Reform Commission. The commission proposed new uniform and monogram for the police force. It received public opinion calling for the depoliticization of Bangladesh Police.
