= Shamima =

Shamima is a feminine Arabic given name derived from Arabic: شميمه meaning "sweet smell". Notable bearers of the name include

- Shamima Akhtar (1957 – 2018), Bangladeshi playback singer
- Shamima Akhtar Tulee (born 1974), Bangladeshi Martial artist
- Shamima Akter Liza (born 1989), Bangladesh chess Woman International Master
- Shamima Ali, Fijian political activist
- Shamima Begum (born 1999), British-born woman who left the UK aged 15 to join ISIL
- Shamima Nazneen, Bangladeshi film, stage and television actress
- Shamima Shaikh (1960 – 1998), South African Muslim women's rights activist, Islamic feminist and journalist
- Shamima Sultana (born 1988), Bangladeshi cricketer
