= Bangladesh at the Paralympics =

- IPC code: BAN
- NPC: National Paralympic Committee of Bangladesh
- Medals: Gold 0 Silver 0 Bronze 0 Total 0

Summer appearances
- 2004; 2008; 2012–2020; 2024

Bangladesh made its Paralympic Games début at the 2004 Summer Paralympics in Athens, sending a single representative (Mokshud Mokshud) to compete in athletics. Mokshud entered only the men's 400m T46 sprint, and failed to advance past the heats, clocking by far the slowest time. In 1:15.90, he was the only athlete to run the race in more than a minute. In 2008, the country once more had a single representative, Abdul Quader Suman. Visually impaired Suman ran the men's 100m sprint in the T12 category, and recorded the slowest time in the heats (16.63s), thus finishing his participation in the Games.

Bangladesh has never taken part in the Winter Paralympics.

== Full results for Bangladesh at the Paralympics ==
Name	Games	Sport	Event	Time	Rank
Mokshud Mokshud	2004 Athens	Athletics	Men's 400 m T46	1:15.90	5th (last) in heat 5; did not advance
Abdul Quader Suman	2008 Beijing	Athletics	Men's 100 m T12	16.63s	4th (last) in heat 4; did not advance

== See also ==
- Bangladesh at the Olympics
