= Bangladesh at the 1992 Summer Olympics =

- IOC code: BAN
- NOC: Bangladesh Olympic Association

in Barcelona
- Competitors: 6 in 3 sports
- Medals: Gold 0 Silver 0 Bronze 0 Total 0

Summer Olympics appearances (overview)
- 1984; 1988; 1992; 1996; 2000; 2004; 2008; 2012; 2016; 2020; 2024

Bangladesh competed at the 1992 Summer Olympics in Barcelona, Spain.

== Competitors ==
The following is the list of number of competitors in the Games.

| Sport | Men | Women | Total |
|---|---|---|---|
| Athletics | 4 | 0 | 4 |
| Shooting | 0 | 1 | 1 |
| Swimming | 1 | 0 | 1 |
| Total | 5 | 1 | 6 |

== Athletics ==
Men
Track events

| Athlete | Events | Heat | | Quarterfinal | | Semifinal | | Final | |
| Athlete | Events | Time | Position | Time | Position | Time | Position | Time | Position |
|---|---|---|---|---|---|---|---|---|---|
| Golam Ambia | 100 m | 11.06 | 6 | Did not advance | | | | | |
| Shahanud Chowdhury | 200 m | 21.88 | 6 | Did not advance | | | | | |
| Mohamed Mehdi Hasan | 400 m | 48.62 | 7 | Did not advance | | | | | |
| Golam Ambia; Mohamed Mehdi Hasan; Shahanud Chowdhury; Shah Jalal (Note: also competed at the 1988 Summer Olympics) | 4 x 100 metres relay | 42.18 | 5 | n/a | | Did not advance | | | |

== Shooting ==
Women

| Athlete | Event | Qualification | | Final | |
| Athlete | Event | Points | Rank | Points | Rank |
|---|---|---|---|---|---|
| Shahana Parveen | 10 m air rifle | 379 | 43 | did not advance | |

== Swimming ==
Men

| Athlete | Events | Heat | | Final | |
| Athlete | Events | Time | Position | Time | Position |
|---|---|---|---|---|---|
| Mohamed Mukhesur Rahman | 200m Breaststroke | 2:51.21 | 52 | Did not advance | |
