= Bangladesh at the Olympics =

- IOC code: BAN
- NOC: Bangladesh Olympic Association
- Website: www.nocban.org
- Medals: Gold 0 Silver 0 Bronze 0 Total 0

Summer appearances
- 1984; 1988; 1992; 1996; 2000; 2004; 2008; 2012; 2016; 2020; 2024

Other related appearances
- India (1900–pres.); Pakistan (1948–pres.)

Bangladesh has competed in every Summer Olympic Games since 1984, but has never participated in the Winter Olympic Games. Bangladesh competed as part of British India prior to 1947 and Pakistan prior to 1971. As of 2024, no athlete competing for Bangladesh has yet to win a medal.

In 2016, Siddikur Rahman became the first Bangladeshi to qualify for the Olympic games in golf, and Bangladesh sent seven athletes to compete, more than any other year. The country has sent other representatives to the Games by the wildcard process. With an approximate population of 170 million, Bangladesh is the most populous country in the world that has never won an Olympic medal.

In 2008, Bangladesh Olympic Association head Wali Ullah has stated that Bangladesh's weak economy and massive corruption accounts for its poor results in sports.

== Timeline of participation ==
Olympic Year/s	Teams		
1900–1932	India		
1936	India		
1948–1968	India	Pakistan	
1972–1980	India	Pakistan	
1984–present	India	Pakistan	Bangladesh

== Medal tables ==
=== Medals by Summer Games ===
Games	Athletes	Gold	Silver	Bronze	Total	Rank
1900–1936	as part of British India					
1948–1968	as part of Pakistan					
1972 Munich	did not participate					
1976 Montreal	did not participate					
1980 Moscow	did not participate					
1984 Los Angeles	1	0	0	0	0	–
1988 Seoul	6	0	0	0	0	–
1992 Barcelona	6	0	0	0	0	–
1996 Atlanta	4	0	0	0	0	–
2000 Sydney	5	0	0	0	0	–
2004 Athens	4	0	0	0	0	–
2008 Beijing	5	0	0	0	0	–
2012 London	5	0	0	0	0	–
2016 Rio de Janeiro	7	0	0	0	0	–
2020 Tokyo	6	0	0	0	0	–
2024 Paris	5	0	0	0	0	–
2028 Los Angeles	future event					
2032 Brisbane	future event					
Total		0	0	0	0	–

== See also ==
- List of flag bearers for Bangladesh at the Olympics
- Bangladesh at the Paralympics
- Pakistan at the Olympics
