= BDCyclists =

Cyclist group in Bangladesh

- Logo of BDCyclists
- Established: May 2011
- Founder: Mozammel Haque
- Type: Cycling Group
- Purpose: Cycling, Healthy lifestyle and Community service
- Location: Bangladesh
- Website: bdcyclists.com

BDCyclists (Bengali: বিডিসাইক্লিস্টস) is a cycling group in Bangladesh. The group was started by Mozammel Haque, a software developer, and his friends in May 2011. The group states, as one of their goals, that they aim to convert 5% of the car owning crowd of Dhaka to cycle commuters.

== Overview ==
=== 2013–2014 ===
In the past, the group has organized about three bicycle rides every week, titled Bike Friday, BDC Nightriders and Josshila Saturday. About 250 cyclists would join in the Bike Friday event. On January 24, 2014, BDCyclists organized its 100th Bike Friday. It also organizes the Critical Mass, a cycling event that is held every month in 300 cities around the world.

To promote cycling, BDCyclists has arranged cycling lessons every Saturday morning in Dhaka known as the BDCyclists Beginner's Lesson. The group has also organized yearly rides to celebrate the national days such as the Independence Day (স্বাধীনতা দিবস), Bengali New Year Day (পহেলা বৈশাখ) and Victory Day (বিজয় দিবস). It has also organized several social and community events throughout the country, such as the 64 Good Acts or the Eid Mubarak Ride.

During the "Eid Mubarak Ride" members of the group distributed gifts to the underprivileged, especially underprivileged children in Dhaka on the morning of Eid Day.

=== 2015–present ===
In 2021, the groups cycling team, TeamBDC, set a relay cycling world record, travelling 1,670 kilometers in 48 hours.

As of 2022, the group's Facebook page consisted of one and a half lakh members.

== Longest single line of bicycles (moving) ==
BDCyclists was the holder of the Guinness World Records for 'Longest single line of bicycles (moving)' from 2016 to 2019. BDCyclists made this record on December 16, 2016 (Victory day of Bangladesh), when 1,186 cyclists rode their bicycles in a continuous single line in Dhaka, Bangladesh.

== See also ==
- Sport in Bangladesh
