= Bangladesh at the 2020 Summer Olympics =

- IOC code: BAN
- NOC: Bangladesh Olympic Association

in Tokyo, Japan July 23, 2021 – August 8, 2021
- Competitors: 6 in 4 sports
- Flag bearers: Diya Siddique; Mohammed Ariful Islam
- Medals: Gold 0 Silver 0 Bronze 0 Total 0

Summer Olympics appearances (overview)
- 1984; 1988; 1992; 1996; 2000; 2004; 2008; 2012; 2016; 2020; 2024; 2028

Other related appearances
- India (1900–pres.); Pakistan (1948–pres.)

Bangladesh competed at the 2020 Summer Olympics in Tokyo, Japan. Originally scheduled to take place in July–August 2020, the games were postponed to 23 July to 8 August 2021, due to the COVID-19 pandemic. The Games marked the nation's tenth appearance at the Summer Olympics after having made its official debut at the 1984 Summer Olympics.

The Bangladeshi contingent consisted of six athletes competing across four sports in the Games. Diya Siddique and Mohammed Ariful Islam were the flag-bearers for the opening ceremony. Bangladesh did not win any medals at the Games, and is yet to win an Olympic medal.

== Background ==
The Bangladesh Olympic Association (BOA) was founded in 1979 and recognized by the International Olympic Committee (IOC) on 12 February 1980. However, Bangladesh did not participate in the 1980 Summer Olympics in Moscow and made its Olympic debut at the 1984 Summer Olympics in Los Angeles. The country has competed at every edition of the Summer Olympic Games since 1984, and the 2020 Summer Olympics marked its tenth appearance at the Games.

The 2020 Summer Olympics were held in Tokyo, Japan, from 23 July to 8 August 2021. Originally scheduled to take place from 24 July to 9 August 2020, the games were postponed due to the COVID-19 pandemic. Bangladesh sent a contingent of 18 members including six athletes for the Games. Sheikh Bashir Ahmed, vice-president of the BOA, served as the chef de mission. Archer Diya Siddique and swimmer Mohammed Ariful Islam were the flag-bearers for the opening ceremony. Bangladesh did not win any medals at the Games and has not won an Olympic medal.

== Competitors ==
The Bangladeshi contingent consisted of six athletes, four men and two women, competing in four sports.

| Sport | Men | Women | Total |
|---|---|---|---|
| Archery | 1 | 1 | 2 |
| Athletics | 1 | 0 | 1 |
| Shooting | 1 | 0 | 1 |
| Swimming | 1 | 1 | 2 |
| Total | 4 | 2 | 6 |

== Archery ==
As per the qualification system drawn up by the World Archery, each National Olympic Committee (NOC) was permitted to enter a maximum of six competitors, three per gender. While NOCs that qualify teams for a particular gender are able to send a three-member team to the team event and also have each member compete in the individual event, the remaining individual spots were filled by individual qualification tournaments and world archery rankings. The qualification for the mixed team event was decided by the combined scores of each country's highest-ranked male and female archers in the ranking round, with the top 16 NOCs advancing to the knockout stage.

Bangladesh qualified two archers for the Games. Ruman Shana secured a direct Olympic quota place by reaching the quarterfinals of the 2019 World Archery Championships in 's-Hertogenbosch, becoming the first Bangladeshi archer to qualify directly for the Olympic Games. Diya Siddique competed in the women's individual event and teamed up with Shana for the mixed team event. Both the archers made their Olympic debut at the Games. This was Bangladesh's third ever representation in the sport after Mohammed Milon and Shamoli Ray competed in the 2012 and 2016 Summer Olympics respectively.

The archery competitions were held at Yumenoshima Park in Tokyo from 23 to 31 July 2021. In the men's individual ranking round, Shana scored 662 points to finish 17th among 64 competitors. He defeated Patrick Huston of Great Britain 7–3 in the round of 64, but lost 4–6 to Crispin Duenas of Canada in the round of 32, and ended his individual campaign with a joint-17th-place finish. In the women's individual ranking round, Siddique scored 635 points to be seeded 36th. In the round of 64, she lost to Karyna Dziominskaya of Belarus by 5–6 in a closely contested match, and finished joint 33rd overall. In the mixed team event, Shana and Siddique were placed 16th with a total of 1,297 points in the ranking round. The pair lost to South Korea in the round of 16 in direct sets, finishing joint-ninth.

| Athlete | Event | Ranking round | | Round of 64 | Round of 32 | Round of 16 | Quarterfinals | Semifinals | Final / BM | Rank |
| Athlete | Event | Score | Seed | Opposition Score | Opposition Score | Opposition Score | Opposition Score | Opposition Score | Opposition Score | Rank |
|---|---|---|---|---|---|---|---|---|---|---|
| Ruman Shana | Men's individual | 662 | 17 | Hall (GBR); W 7–3 | Duenas (CAN); L 4–6 | Did not advance | | | | 17 |
| Diya Siddique | Women's individual | 635 | 36 | Dziominskaya (BLR); L 5–6 | Did not advance | | | | | 33 |
| Ruman Shana; Diya Siddique | Mixed team | 1297 | 16 Q | —N/a | | South Korea; L 0–6 | Did not advance | | | 9 |

== Athletics ==
As per World Athletics (WA), a NOC was allowed to enter up to three qualified athletes in each individual event and one qualified relay team if the Olympic Qualifying Standards (OQS) had been met during the qualifying period at the events approved by WA. The remaining places were allocated based on the World Athletics rankings and universality slot.

Bangladesh received one universality quota place for the men's 400 metres event. Mohammad Jahir Rayhan represented the nation at the Games. Born on 25 April 2001, Rayhan specialised in 200 metres and 400 metres. He had represented Bangladesh at the World Athletics Championships and Asian Athletics Championships. At the 2019 Asian Athletics Championships at Doha, he finished sixth in his 400 metres heat with a time of 48.51 seconds.

The athletics events took place at the Japan National Stadium in Tokyo. On 1 August 2021, Rayhan competed in the third heat of the first round in the men's 400 metres. He finished eighth and last in the heat with a time of 48.29 seconds and did not advance to the semifinals.

Track

| Athlete | Event | Heat | | Semifinal | | Final | |
| Athlete | Event | Result | Rank | Result | Rank | Result | Rank |
|---|---|---|---|---|---|---|---|
| Mohammad Jahir Rayhan | Men's 400 m | 48.29 | 8 | Did not advance | | | |

Key

- Note– Ranks given for track events are within the athlete's heat only
- Q = Qualified for the next round
- q = Qualified for the next round as a fastest loser

== Shooting ==
As per the International Shooting Sport Federation (ISSF) guidelines, quota places for the Games were allocated to the NOCs based on the results at designated ISSF supervised events held from 1 September 2018 to 6 June 2021. Four quota places in individual events were awarded to the shooters who competed in the respective mixed team events (rifle, pistol, and trap). Initial quota places were allocated only to the NOCs, who were then allowed to choose the individual shooters. After the initial quotas were allocated, shooters were granted entries based on the ISSF world rankings, which were awarded directly to the individual shooters and were not permitted to be changed by the NOCs. Bangladesh received a quota place for the men's 10 m air rifle event.

Abdullah Hel Baki represented the nation in the competition. Born on 1 August 1989 in Gazipur, Baki is affiliated with the Dhaka Rifle Club. He took up sport shooting in 2005 and started competing internationally in 2010. He had won three medals at the Commonwealth Games, a bronze medal in the men's 10 metre air rifle pairs event in 2010, and silver medals in the individual 10 metre air rifle event in 2014 and 2018. This was his second Olympic appearance at the Summer Olympics. He had previously represented Bangladesh at the 2016 Summer Olympics in Rio de Janeiro, where he finished 25th in the men's 10 m air rifle event with a score of 621.2 points.

The shooting events were held at the Asaka Shooting Range in Tokyo. In the qualification round held on 25 July 2021, Baki scored 619.8 points, finishing 41st among 47 competitors, and did not advance to the final.

| Athlete | Event | Qualification | | Final | |
| Athlete | Event | Points | Rank | Points | Rank |
|---|---|---|---|---|---|
| Abdullah Hel Baki | Men's 10 m air rifle | 619.8 | 41 | Did not advance | |

Key: Q = Qualified for the next round

== Swimming ==
As per the Fédération internationale de natation (FINA) guidelines, a NOC was permitted to enter a maximum of two qualified athletes in each individual event, who have achieved the Olympic Qualifying Time (OQT). If the quota was not filled, one athlete per event was allowed to enter, provided they achieved the Olympic Selection Time (OST). The qualifying time standards should have been achieved in competitions approved by World Aquatics in the period between 1 March 2019 to 27 June 2021. FINA also allowed NOCs to enter swimmers (one per gender) under a universality place even if they have not achieved the standard entry times (OQT/OST). Bangladesh received a universality invitation from FINA to send two swimmers (one per gender).

Bangladesh was represented Mohammed Ariful Islam in the men's 50 m freestyle and Junayna Ahmed in the women's 50 m freestyle. Ariful Islam was born on 10 January 1999 and is part of the Bangladesh Navy. He had represented Bangladesh in various international events including the 2018 Commonwealth Games, the 2019 World Aquatics Championships, and the 2019 South Asian Games. At the 2019 South Asian Games, he set national records in the men's 100 metres and 200 metres freestyle events.

Ahmed was born on 30 June 2003 in London, and is affiliated with Romford Town Swimming Club in London. Before her Olympic debut at the Games, she represented Bangladesh at the 2019 World Aquatics Championships in Gwangju, where she competed in the women's 50 metres freestyle and 50 metres, 100 metres, and 200 metres butterfly events. At the 2019 South Asian Games, she won gold medals in the women's 200 metres butterfly, 800 metres freestyle, and 400 metres individual medley events. She also holds several national records across freestyle and butterfly events.

The swimming events were held at the Tokyo Aquatics Centre in Tokyo. On 30 July 2021, Ahmed set a national record time of 29.78 seconds in the 50 metres freestyle event. However, she finished fifth in her heat, was placed 68th overall, and did not advance to the semifinals. On 30 July 2021, Islam finished fourth in his heat with a time of 24.81 seconds in the men's 50 metres freestyle. He placed 51st overall and did not advance to the semifinals.

| Athlete | Event | Heat | | Semifinal | | Final | |
| Athlete | Event | Time | Rank | Time | Rank | Time | Rank |
|---|---|---|---|---|---|---|---|
| Mohammed Ariful Islam | Men's 50 m freestyle | 24.81 | 51 | Did not advance | | | |
| Junayna Ahmed | Women's 50 m freestyle | 29.78 | 68 | Did not advance | | | |
