= Shamima Akhtar Tulee =

Bangladeshi martial artist

- Born: 20 July 1974 (age 52); Dhaka, Bangladesh
- Education: Master's Graduate (English literature), University of Dhaka
- Occupations: Martial artist, fitness consultant
- Years active: 1989 – present
- Known for: First Bangladeshi Woman to get the Shotokan Karate Blackbelt
- Children: 1

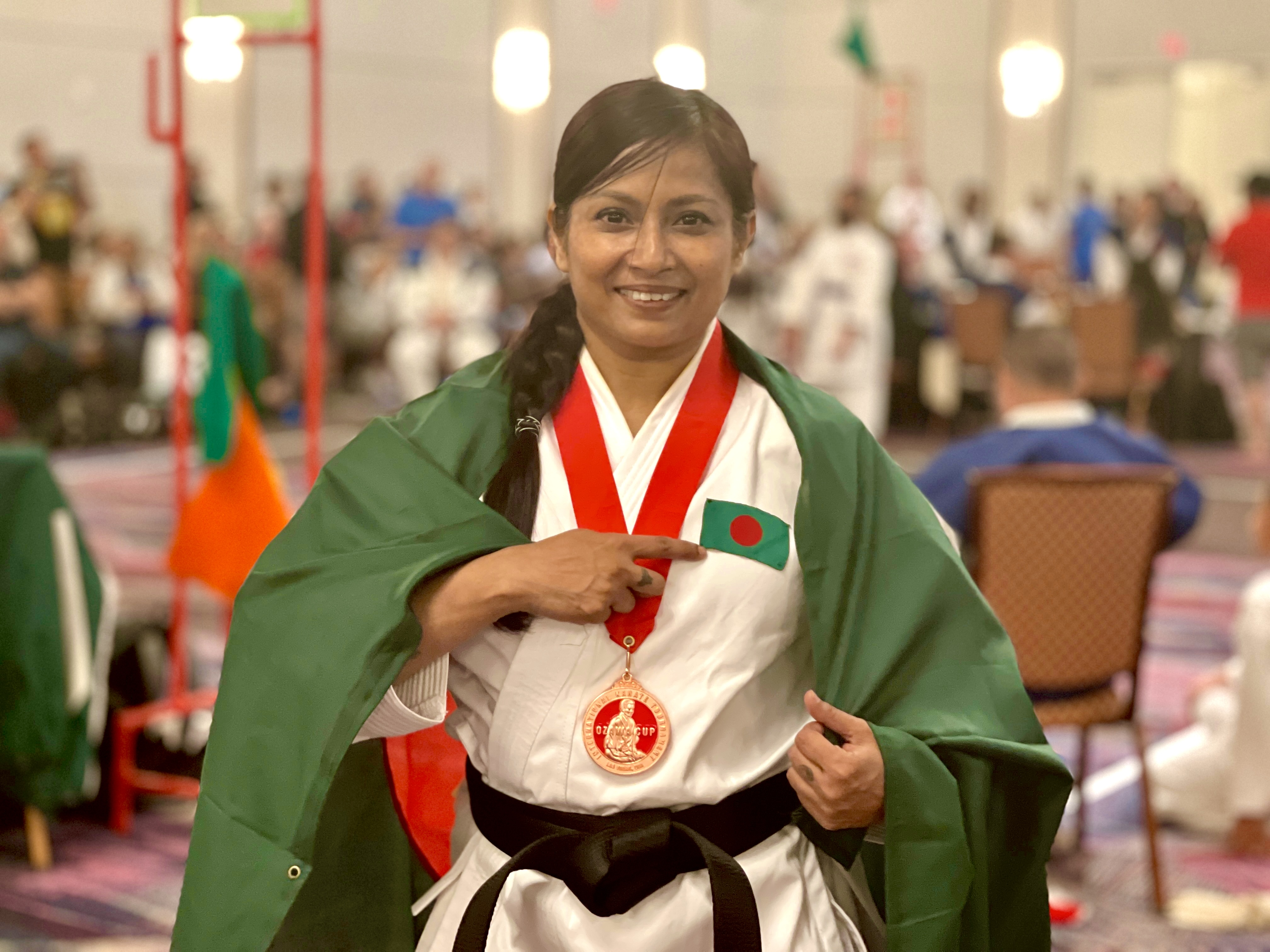
Shamima Akhtar Tulee, after winning her medal at the Ozawa Cup, Las Vegas, USA. 16 Apr 2022

Shamima Akhtar Tulee is a Bangladeshi martial artist who is the first woman in Bangladesh to hold a Shotokan Karate Black Belt, from the Bangladesh Karate Federation, in 1989. She has been the winner of the National Karate Championship five times from 1989 through 1993. She is also the first Bangladeshi Female to win a medal in an International Karate Championship, The Ozawa Cup, in the veteran category; and along with her son, Tahseen Shaan Leon, they formed the first 'mother-son' duo from Bangladesh to win medals at the same International Karate Championship at the same time in 2022. In addition, she is also the First and Only Bangladeshi representative of UNESCO ICM. In 2022 She presented her Research Paper on Youth Martial Arts Education-Theory, in South Korea at ICM’s 2022 International Martial Arts Academic Seminar as part of the MARIE program (Martial Arts Research Initiative for Experts). She has won many other important awards for self-defense and martial arts. Her notable awards include the Shadhinota Padak, 2022, Sher-e-Bangla AK Fazlul Haque Memorial Medal, 2018, and Lifetime Karate Achievement Award, 2018 .

== Career ==
Tulee began to study martial arts at a young age. Now, is currently teaching women's self-defense and fitness strategies all over Bangladesh. She has founded her own fitness centre called "Combat Gym by Tulee" in 2001, reaching over 10,000 women.

She is currently a regular contributor to health programs on TV Channel in Bangladesh and writes columns on health pages in various national magazines. She writes regular columns in The Daily Observer in the Health and Nutrition section.

She served as a karate referee at the SKIS'S International Karate Championship in India in 2017 and the 29th Busan Mayor's Cup Karatedo Championship in South Korea that same year.

=== Positions in the Fitness Industry ===
- Member, Executive Committee, Organising Secretary, Regional Committee, JKA WF Bangladesh
- First Female Gym Owner, Dhaka Gym Owners’ Welfare Foundation
- Vice-President, Bangladesh Savate Association
- Women Secretary, Shotokan Karate Bangladesh
- Team Manager of Bangladesh Team, Asian Savate Championship
- Member, Executive Committee, Bangladesh Powerlifting Association
- Women Organising Secretary, Executive Committee, Bangladesh Arm Sports Association
- Member Secretary, Prize Distribution Committee, South Asian Karate Championship

== TV programs ==
| Program Name | Television Channel |
|---|---|
| Shastho Protidin - A Daily Health Show | NTV |
| Ayenar Shamne | ATN BANGLA |
| Ranga Shokal | MASRAANGA TV |
| Shundorer Shopney | JAMUNA TV |
| Roop Sojja | Boishakhi TV |

== Awards ==
- Sher-E-Bangla A.K Fazlul Haq Memorial Award’ 2019 - Shamima Akhtar Tulee was awarded ‘Sher-E-Bangla A.K Fazlul Haq Memorial Award’ 2019 for her ‘Pioneering Contributions towards Health and Fitness for Women and Children’ in Bangladesh, by ‘Muktijuddher Chetona Bastobayon Parishod’, University of Dhaka, on the eve of 57th death anniversary of Fazlul Haque, 30 April 2019.
- ‘Fakir Lalon Shah Memorial Award’ 2019 - She also received an Honorary Award- ‘Fakir Lalon Shah Memorial Award’ 2019 for being the First Woman to wear the Karate Black Belt in Bangladesh, by Swadesh Shangskritik Foundation, University of Dhaka, on the eve of 245th Birthday of Lalon Shah, 16 October 2019.
- 'Shadhinota Padak' 2022 by ‘Muktijuddher Chetona Bastobayon Parishod’.
- Women's Self Defense Award by JCI.
- Lifetime Karate Achievement Award, 2018 from Shotokan Karate Bangladesh.
- Honorary Award for ‘Today’s Athena’, 2020 from Natural Science Club, BRAC University.
- Honorary Award for “Eating Disorder Week”, 2020 from Neutrepreneur BD.
- Honorary Award for “Girls’ Entrepreneur Bootcamp” from BdOSN, 2020 & 2019.
- Honorary Award for ‘Women’s Self Defence’, 2018 from Rotaract Club, East West University.

== Works ==
- Beyam Chere Dile Ki Mota Hoe Jabo ?! ব্যায়াম ছেড়ে দিলে কি মোটা হয়ে যাব?! [Will I gain weight if I stop exercising?!] (In Bengali), Shikhha Prakashani, 2021, ISBN 9789849334286
