= Bangladesh at the 2000 Summer Olympics =

- IOC code: BAN
- NOC: Bangladesh Olympic Association
- Website: www.nocban.org

in Sydney
- Competitors: 5 (2 men and 3 women) in 3 sports
- Flag bearer: Sabrina Sultana (shooting)
- Medals: Gold 0 Silver 0 Bronze 0 Total 0

Summer Olympics appearances (overview)
- 1984; 1988; 1992; 1996; 2000; 2004; 2008; 2012; 2016; 2020; 2024

Bangladesh competed at the 2000 Summer Olympics in Sydney, Australia.

== Competitors ==
In total, 5 athletes represented Bangladesh at the 2000 Summer Olympics in Sydney, New South Wales, Australia across three different sports.

Sport	Men	Women	Total
Athletics	1	1	2
Shooting	0	1	1
Swimming	1	1	2
Total	2	3	5

== Athletics ==
Men

Athlete	Event	Heat		Quarterfinal		Semifinal		Final	
Athlete	Event	Result	Rank	Result	Rank	Result	Rank	Result	Rank
Mohamed Mahbub Alam	200 m	did not finish		did not advance					

Women

Athlete	Event	Heat		Quarterfinal		Semifinal		Final	
Athlete	Event	Result	Rank	Result	Rank	Result	Rank	Result	Rank
Foujia Huda	100 m	12.75	8	did not advance					

== Shooting ==
Women

Athlete	Event	Qualification		Final	
Athlete	Event	Points	Rank	Points	Rank
Sabrina Sultana	10 m air rifle	383	46	did not advance	
Sabrina Sultana	50 metre rifle three positions	554	38	did not advance	

== Swimming ==
Men

Athlete	Events	Heat		Final	
Athlete	Events	Time	Position	Time	Position
Karar Samedul Islam	100m Breaststroke	1:14.93	64	did not advance	

Women

Athlete	Events	Heat		Final	
Athlete	Events	Time	Position	Time	Position
Doli Akhter	100m Breaststroke	DSQ		did not advance	
