= Kallyandi =

Kallyandi is a village in Bandar Upazila, Narayanganj District of Bangladesh.

== History ==
In March 2007, there was an outbreak of Avian flu in Kallyandi.

Selim Osman, member of parliament, humiliated the Hindu principal of Piyar Sattar Latif High School in May 2016 for allegedly insulting Islam. The chairman of the school committee was Farukul Islam. Shyamal Kanti Bhakta, the principal, was sent to jail over a corruption case after Additional Chief Judicial Magistrate Ashok Kumar Dutta rejected his bail petition.
