= Bangladesh at the 2004 Summer Paralympics =

- IPC code: BAN
- NPC: National Paralympic Committee of Bangladesh

in Athens
- Competitors: 1 in 1 sport
- Flag bearer: Mokshud Mokshud
- Medals: Gold 0 Silver 0 Bronze 0 Total 0

Summer Paralympics appearances (overview)
- 2004; 2008; 2012–2020; 2024

Bangladesh made its Paralympic début at the 2004 Summer Paralympics in Athens. The country was represented by a single athlete competing in one sport, and did not win a medal.

== Sports ==
=== Athletics ===
==== Men's track ====
Athlete	Class	Event	Heats		Semifinal		Final	
Athlete	Class	Event	Result	Rank	Result	Rank	Result	Rank
Mokshud Mokshud	T46	400m	1:15.90	10	did not advance			

== See also ==
- Bangladesh at the Paralympics
- Bangladesh at the 2004 Summer Olympics
