= Bangladesh at the 1984 Summer Olympics =

- IOC code: BAN
- NOC: Bangladesh Olympic Association

in Los Angeles
- Flag bearer: Saidur Rahman Dawn
- Medals: Gold 0 Silver 0 Bronze 0 Total 0

Summer Olympics appearances (overview)
- 1984; 1988; 1992; 1996; 2000; 2004; 2008; 2012; 2016; 2020; 2024; 2028

Other related appearances
- India (1900–pres.); Pakistan (1948–pres.)

Bangladesh sent a delegation to compete in the Olympic Games for the first time at the 1984 Summer Olympics in Los Angeles, United States from 28 July to 12 August 1984. The Bangladeshi delegation consisted of a single track and field athlete, Saidur Rahman Dawn. In his two events, the 100 metres and 200 metres, he did not qualify to advance beyond the first round.

== Background ==
The Bangladesh Olympic Association was recognized by the International Olympic Committee on 1 January 1980. The nation joined the United States-led boycott of the 1980 Summer Olympics, and therefore did not make their first Olympic appearance until these Los Angeles Games. The 1984 Summer Olympics were held in Los Angeles from 28 July to 12 August 1984; a total of 6,829 athletes representing 140 National Olympic Committees took part. Saidur Rahman Dawn was the only competitor sent by Bangladesh to Los Angeles, and he was the flagbearer for the opening ceremony.

== Athletics ==
Saidur Rahman Dawn was 21 years old at the time of the Los Angeles Olympics, and was making his only Olympic appearance. On 3 August, he took part in the heats of the 100 metres race, where he was drawn into eight, which he finished in 11.25 seconds, in eighth and last place for his heat. Only the top three in each heat and the next seven fastest from all heats could advance, and Dawn was eliminated. The gold medal was eventually won by Carl Lewis of the United States, the silver belonged to fellow American Sam Graddy, and the bronze was won by Canadian Ben Johnson. Three days later Dawn took part in the heats of the 200 metres. He was drawn into heat 1, and finished in a time of 22.59 seconds; seventh and last among those who finished his heat. This time, only the top three from a heat and the next two fastest overall could advance, and Dawn's competition came to an end. Americans eventually swept the podium, with Lewis winning the gold medal, Kirk Baptiste the silver, and Thomas Jefferson the bronze.

Athlete	Events	Heat		Semifinal		Final	
Athlete	Events	Time	Position	Time	Position	Time	Position
Saidur Rahman Dawn	100 m	11.25	8	Did not advance			
Saidur Rahman Dawn	200 m	22.59	7	Did not advance			
