= Bangladesh Weightlifting Federation =

Sports governing body

- Formation: 1972
- Headquarters: Dhaka, Bangladesh
- Region served: Bangladesh
- Official language: Bengali

Bangladesh Weightlifting Federation is the national federation for Weightlifting and is responsible for governing the sport in Bangladesh. It is an affiliate of the Bangladesh Olympic Association.

The Director General of Border Guard Bangladesh usually serves as the president of the Bangladesh Weightlifting Federation.

== History ==
Bangladesh Weightlifting Federation was established in 1972. Mohiuddin Ahmed was the general secretary of Bangladesh Weightlifting Federation from 1976 to 2018. In 1977, it became affiliated with the Asian Weightlifting Federation.

In 2008, Major General Shakil Ahmed, killed in the Bangladesh Rifles mutiny of 2009, and Wing Commander Mohiuddin Ahmed were elected president and general secretary of the Bangladesh Weightlifting Federation respectively. It was the last election of the federation since which it has been run through ad hoc committees appointed by the government of Bangladesh.

Mabia Akhter won a bronze in the 2012 South Asian Weightlifting Championship, silver in the 2013 Commonwealth Weightlifting Championship in Malaysia. In 2016, she took part in the Asian Weightlifting Championships for the first time and stood 13th in the women's 63 kg weight class. Mabia stood 6th in the same category during her 18th Asian Games journey.

In November 2018, the Bangladesh Weightlifting Federation experienced a crisis after a female weightlifter, represented by Ain o Salish Kendra, accused a staff member of the federation of rape. Bangladesh Weightlifting Federation and the National Sports Council began two separate investigations into the allegation.

In 2019, Lieutenant Colonel Mohammad Nazrul Islam of the Border Guard Bangladesh became the general secretary of the Bangladesh Weightlifting Federation. Weightlifters have criticised the lack of training equipment, proper diet, and coaching for poor performance in the Asian Weightlifting Championships.
