= Nilufar Yasmin (athlete) =

Bangladeshi athlete (born 1975)

Personal information
- Nationality: Bangladeshi
- Born: 1 July 1975 (age 51)

Sport
- Sport: Athletics
- Event: Long jump

Nilufar Yasmin (born 1 July 1975) is a Bangladeshi athlete. She competed in the women's long jump at the 1996 Summer Olympics.
