= Bangladesh Judo Federation =

National federation for judo

- Formation: 1972
- Headquarters: Dhaka, Bangladesh
- Region served: Bangladesh
- Official language: Bengali

The Bangladesh Judo Federation is the national federation for judo and is responsible for governing the sport in Bangladesh.

== History ==
The Bangladesh Judo Federation was established in 1972 as the Bangladesh Judo and Karate Federation. In 2001, the Bangladesh Judo and Karate Federation were broken into two, Bangladesh Judo Federation and Bangladesh Karate Federation, by President of Bangladesh Shahabuddin Ahmed and Chief of Bangladesh Army Lieutenant General M Harun-Ar-Rashid. On 14 March 2020, The Japan Judo Federation donated equipment to the Bangladesh Judo Federation.

In 2019, President of Bangladesh Judo Federation, Brigadier General (Rtd) SK Abu Baker brought allegations against the General Secretary AKM Selim. This resulted in an investigation by the National Sports Council.
