= Bangladesh at the 2008 Summer Olympics =

- IOC code: BAN
- NOC: Bangladesh Olympic Association
- Website: www.nocban.org

in Beijing
- Competitors: 5 in 3 sports
- Flag bearer: Rubel Rana
- Medals: Gold 0 Silver 0 Bronze 0 Total 0

Summer Olympics appearances (overview)
- 1984; 1988; 1992; 1996; 2000; 2004; 2008; 2012; 2016; 2020; 2024; 2028

Other related appearances
- India (1900–pres.); Pakistan (1948–pres.)

Bangladesh sent five representatives to the 2008 Summer Olympics in Beijing, China to compete in three fields: athletics, shooting and swimming.

Bangladesh failed to qualify any competitors; the country's entries all took part thanks to the wildcard process.

== Athletics ==
Mohamed Abu Abdullah competed in the 100 metres sprint and placed 8th in his heat without advancing to the second round. He ran the distance in a time of 11.07 seconds.

Men

Athlete	Event	Heat		Quarterfinal		Semifinal		Final	
Athlete	Event	Result	Rank	Result	Rank	Result	Rank	Result	Rank
Abu Abdullah Mohammed	100 m	11.07	8	Did not advance					

Women

Athlete	Event	Heat		Quarterfinal		Semifinal		Final	
Athlete	Event	Result	Rank	Result	Rank	Result	Rank	Result	Rank
Beauty Nazmun Nahar	100 m	12.52	8	Did not advance					

Key

- Note–Ranks given for track events are within the athlete's heat only
- Q = Qualified for the next round
- q = Qualified for the next round as a fastest loser or, in field events, by position without achieving the qualifying target
- NR = National record
- N/A = Round not applicable for the event
- Bye = Athlete not required to compete in round

== Shooting ==
Men

Athlete	Event	Qualification		Final	
Athlete	Event	Points	Rank	Points	Rank
Mohammad Hossain	10 m air rifle	581	46	Did not advance	

== Swimming ==
Men

Athlete	Event	Heat		Semifinal		Final	
Athlete	Event	Time	Rank	Time	Rank	Time	Rank
Rubel Rana	100 m backstroke	1:04.82	45	Did not advance			

Women

Athlete	Event	Heat		Semifinal		Final	
Athlete	Event	Time	Rank	Time	Rank	Time	Rank
Doli Akhter	50 m freestyle	30.23	73	Did not advance			
