= Karar Rahman =

Bangladeshi swimmer

Personal information
- Born: 17 January 1975 (age 51) Bangladesh

Sport
- Sport: Swimming
- Strokes: Breaststroke
- College team: Bangladesh Krira Shikkha Protishtan "BKSP"

Karar Rahman (born 17 January 1975) is a Bangladeshi swimmer. He competed in the 100 m breaststroke at the 1996 Summer Olympics, Rahman finished in 44th place in the heats. As of July 2025, Rahman ranked second among Bangladeshi swimmers.
