= Golam Ambia =

Bangladeshi sprinter (born 1966)

Personal information
- Nationality: Bangladeshi
- Born: 2 February 1966 (age 59)

Sport
- Sport: Sprinting
- Event: 100 metres

Golam Ambia (born 2 February 1966) is a former Bangladeshi sprinter who competed in the men's 100m competition at the 1992 Summer Olympics. He recorded an 11.06, which was not enough to qualify for the next round past the heats. His personal best is 10.40, set in 1991. Ambia was also on Bangladesh's 4 × 100 m team, which posted a 42.18, for 5th in its heat.
