= Bangladesh Archery Federation =

Archery Federation

- Sport: Archery
- Jurisdiction: Bangladesh
- Abbreviation: BAF
- Founded: 2001
- Affiliation: World Archery Federation
- Affiliation date: 2003
- Regional affiliation: World Archery Asia
- Affiliation date: 2001
- Headquarters: 66/11A Maulana Bhasani Stadium, Dhaka-1000
- Location: Dhaka Division
- President: Mohammad Mainul Islam
- Secretary: Kazi Rajib Uddin Ahmed Chapol

Official website
- www.archery.org.bd
- (Bangladesh)

Bangladesh Archery Federation is the national federation for archery and is responsible for governing the sport in Bangladesh. Lieutenant General Mohammad Mainul Islam is the president and Kazi Rajib Uddin Ahmed Chapol the general secretary of the foundation.

== History ==
Bangladesh Archery Federation was established in 2001. It became an affiliate of the World Archery Federation in 2003. In November 2019, the foundation received sponsorship from City Group.

== Affiliations ==
The federation is affiliated with:

- World Archery Federation
- World Archery Asia
- Bangladesh Olympic Association
- National Sports Council
