= Bangladesh Wushu Federation =

Sports governing body

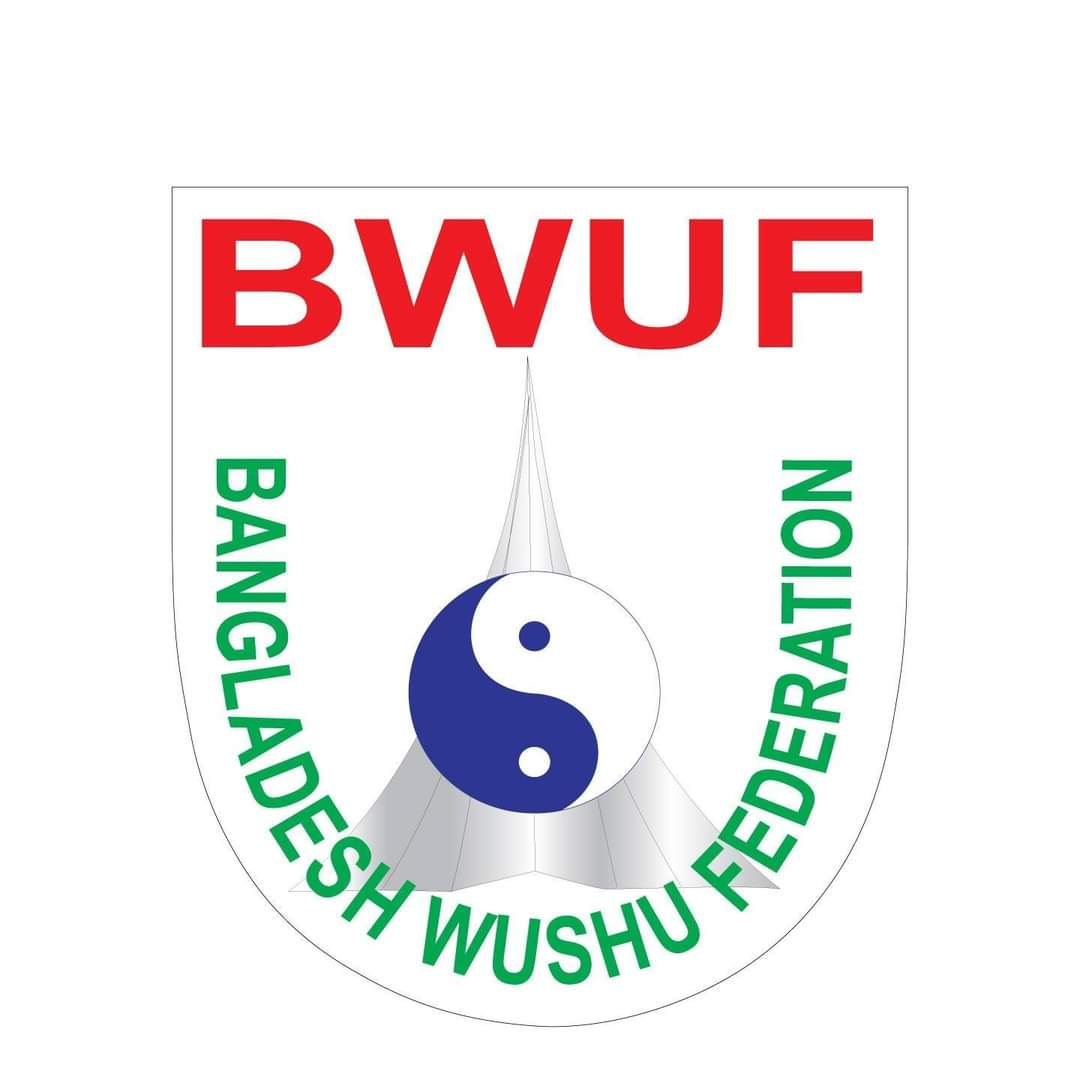
- Formation: 2007
- Headquarters: Dhaka, Bangladesh
- Region served: Bangladesh
- Official language: Bengali
- Website: Bangladesh Wushu Federation

The Bangladesh Wushu Federation is the national federation for Wushu and is responsible for governing the sport in Bangladesh. N/A, Member of Parliament, is the president and Md. Dulal Hossain is the general secretary of the federation.

== History ==
Bangladesh Wushu Federation was established in 2007 as the Bangladesh Wushu Association. In 2018, Bangladesh Wushu Association was renamed to Bangladesh Wushu Federation by the National Sports Council.
