= 2004 Summer Paralympics =

Multi-parasport event in Athens, Greece

XII Paralympic Games
- Location: Athens, Greece
- Motto: Great Athletes. Great Performances. (Greek: Μεγάλοι Αθλητές. Μεγάλες Επιδόσεις.)
- Nations: 135
- Athletes: 3,808
- Events: 517 in 19 sports
- Opening: 17 September 2004
- Closing: 28 September 2004
- Opened by: President Konstantinos Stephanopoulos
- Closed by: IPC President Philip Craven
- Cauldron: Georgios Toptsis
- Stadium: Olympic Stadium

The 2004 Summer Paralympics (Greek: Θερινοί Παραολυμπιακοί Αγώνες 2004), the 12th Summer Paralympic Games, were a major international multi-sport event for athletes with disabilities governed by the International Paralympic Committee, held in Athens, Greece, from 17 to 28 September 2004. 3,749 athletes (2,600 Men and 1,149 Women) from 135 countries participated. During these games 304 World Records were broken with 448 Paralympic Games Records being broken across 19 different sports. 8,863 volunteers worked along the Organizing Committee.

Four new events were introduced to the Paralympics in Athens; 5-a-side football for the blind, quads wheelchair tennis, and women's competitions in judo and sitting volleyball. Following a scandal at the 2000 Summer Paralympics, in which the Spanish intellectually-disabled basketball team was stripped of their gold medal after it was found that multiple players had not met the eligibility requirements, ID-class events were suspended.

It was also the last time that the old Paralympic symbol was used. The new Paralympic symbol was introduced in 2006.

== Host City Bid Process ==
Athens was chosen as the host city during the 106th IOC Session held in Lausanne, Switzerland on 5 September 1997. The Greek capital had lost its bid to organize the 1996 Summer Olympics to the American city of Atlanta nearly seven years before, during the 96th IOC Session in Tokyo, Japan on 18 September 1990. Under the direction of Gianna Angelopoulos-Daskalaki, Athens pursued another bid, this time for the right to host the Summer Olympics in 2004. The success of Athens in securing the 2004 Games was based largely on the bid's appeal to human values, the history of the Games from the ancient to modern periods and the emphasis that Athens is placed at the pivotal role that Greece and Athens could play in promoting the Modern Olympism and the Olympic Movement.

Unlike the 1996 bid committee that was seen as arrogant when the city was bidding, the 2004 bid was lauded for its low scale, humility, honest and earnestness, its focused message, and a more detailed bid concept. Concerns and criticisms had been raised during the unsuccessful 1996 bid – primarily in critical subjects about the city's infrastructural readiness, its air pollution, its budget and politicization of the Games events and their preparations. Along with a successful organization of other events such as the 1991 Mediterranean Games, the 1994 FIVB Volleyball Men's World Championship, 1994 World Fencing Championships and the successful 1997 World Championships in Athletics, one month before the Olympic host city election was crucial in allaying lingering fears and concerns among the sporting community and some IOC members about the Greek ability to host international sporting events. Another factor that contributed to the Greek capital's selection was a growing sentiment among some IOC members to restore some original values of the Olympics to the Modern Games, a component which they felt was lost during the 1996 Summer Olympics.

== New rules applied to the Paralympics ==
This was the last edition of the Summer Paralympics in which cities could make the decision whether or not to host the Games. As they were still seen as an optional and second-tier event. International Olympic Committee (IOC) was motivated after the high number of problems concerning the 1996 Summer Paralympics held in Atlanta with a different organization started a strategic partnership with the International Paralympic Committee (IPC) and demanded from all 11 applicant cities their plans regarding the Paralympics for the first time. All the 11 bidding cities agreed to accept these requirements, but only three proposed different organizations.

== Torch relay ==
The same torch design used for the Olympics was used for the Paralympic Games. The flame was lit in a ritual carried out at dusk on September 9, 2004, in the Temple of Hephaestus, at the foot of the Acropolis and resulted in the fire raised from a forge and a reenactment of one of the founding myths of the city of Athens. The first torchbearer was the swimmer Kostantinos Fykas who won 2 gold medals in Sydney, 4 years earlier and 1 silver in Atlanta. The relay took it throughout Athens metropolitan area, and its route wanted to contrast with that of the Olympic torch, by demonstrating the modern side of Greece, passing through 54 municipalities and covering a distance of 410 km.

The journey began from the heart of Athens, in Thiseio. After the forge ceremony, the Paralympic Torch stopped at Odeon of Herodes Atticus. The route also passed by the Temple of Poseidon, Sounion and Brauron, as well as through the cities of Megara and Elefsina, before continuing along the coast towards Sounio and the Marathon Dam. On September 17, the Paralympic Flame arrived in the Olympic Stadium during the Opening Ceremony. A total of 680 torchbearers took part in the relay.

== Medal count ==
A total of 1567 medals were awarded during the Athens games: 519 gold, 516 silver, and 532 bronze. China topped the medal count for the first time with more gold medals, more silver medals, and more medals overall than any other nation. In the table below, the ranking sorts by the number of gold medals earned by a nation (in this context a nation is an entity represented by a National Paralympic Committee).

Rank	Nation	Gold	Silver	Bronze	Total
1	China	63	46	32	141
2	Great Britain	35	30	29	94
3	Canada	28	19	25	72
4	United States	27	22	39	88
5	Australia	26	39	36	101
6	Ukraine	24	12	19	55
7	Spain	20	27	24	71
8	Germany	19	28	31	78
9	France	18	26	30	74
10	Japan	17	17	20	54
Totals (10 entries)		277	266	285	828

Among the top individual medal winners was Mayumi Narita of Japan, who took seven golds and one bronze medal in swimming, setting six world records in the process and bringing her overall Paralympic gold medal total to fifteen. Chantal Petitclerc of Canada won five golds and set three world records in wheelchair racing, while Swedish shooter Jonas Jacobsson took four gold medals. France's Béatrice Hess won her nineteenth and twentieth Paralympic gold medals in swimming. Swimmer Trischa Zorn of the United States won just one medal, a bronze, but it was her 55th ever Paralympic medal. She retained her position as the most successful Paralympian of all times.

== Opening ceremony ==
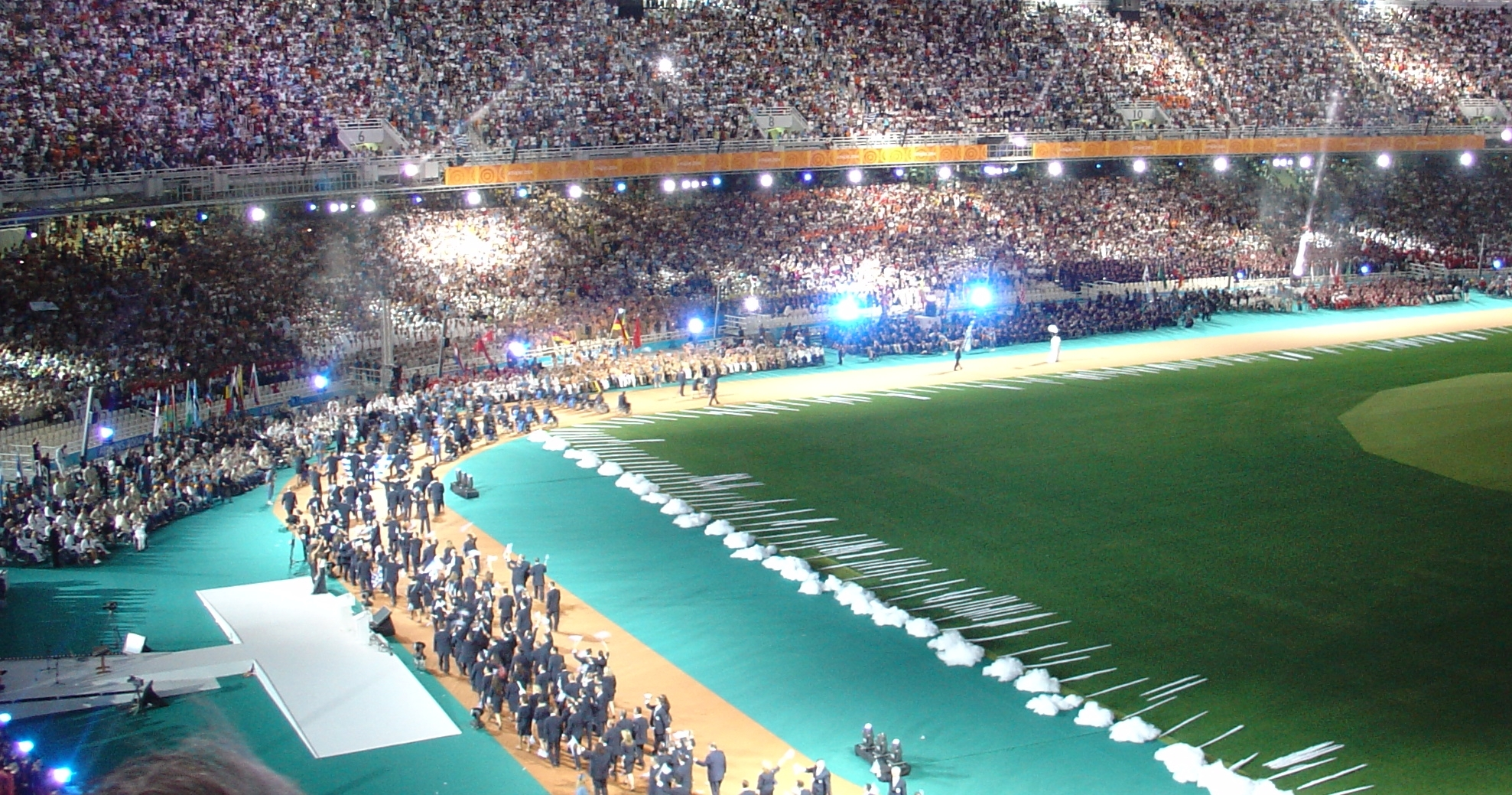
The parade of nations during the Paralympics opening ceremony

The opening ceremony for the 2004 Summer Paralympics took place on the evening of 17 September 2004 in the Athens Olympic Stadium. The protagonist of the ceremony was a 26 meter high plane tree (with more than 195,000 leaves) acting also as the Tree of Life mounted in the center of the Olympic Stadium which symbolized the force of life and all positive forms of energy.This tree acted as a timeline between antiquity and modernity, contrasting with the symbolism of the olive tree, used during the Olympic Games opening ceremonies.

The plane is an important part of the literary scenery of Plato's dialogue Phaedrus and group of children raised lights to the sky in a visualization of Hippocrates passing on knowledge to future generations, alluding to the father of medicine Hippocrates.It was followed by a unique performance of ancient Greek philosophic concept of basic elements-fire, water, earth and air, in a concept based "a journey to the sun". The formal part of the ceremony began with the Hymn to Liberty sung by the Games ambassador, the Greek singer Vicky Leandros. Using an allegory with theatrical parts as well as light and music, the show featured the story of human achievement and perseverance in the face of adversity, always falling back to the motif of human achievement and the strength of life being a considerable force in the world. The Parade of Nations subsequently started and was accompanied by the music of French composers Yves Stepping and Jean Christophe.

The music featured throughout this parade told the story of Hephaestos, a Greek god and son of Zeus and Hera. Being unusually small, he was cast from Mount Olympus and left to die by his mother, but was nursed back to health by Thetis and Eurynome, who also taught him how to work a foundry. Despite all the adversities and impairments he incurred as a result of being cast down, Hephaestos grew up to become the god of Fire and Metallurgy, tying his myth into the topic of overcoming adversity through perseverance and the strength of life. After that, fireworks erupted at the stadium. There were 150 local support staff involved and 400 volunteers. The children were from ages 8 to 17, coming from Australia, France, Spain, Greece and Germany. The actors Afroditi Simiti, Giannis Zouganelis and the interpreter Sophia Roboli were the Masters of Ceremonies. At the end of the ceremony, Greek tenor Mario Frangoulis performed alongside Kalli Georgelli a special song composed to the event.

During the speeches, Sir Philip Craven, the President of the International Paralympic Committee, was accompanied by the head of the organizing committee Gianna Angelopoulos-Daskalaki, who told the athletes and the audience: "The Olympic flame illuminates athletes. Many of you will leave Athens with medals, but all of you will leave as champions." Phil Craven quoted Democritus in his speech: "Two thousand years ago, Democritus said "To win oneself is the first and best of all victories." This holds true for all athletes, but especially for Paralympians. Recognising and cultivating your unique abilities and mastering challenges – you set standards and give expression for many people, young and old, around the world." The Games were officially declared opened by the President of the Hellenic Republic Konstantinos Stephanopoulos in Greek, accompanied by the Adjutant to the President of the Hellenic Republic Army Lieutenant Colonel Dimitrios Reskos.

"Κηρύσσω την έναρξη των Παραολυμπιακών Αγώνων της Αθήνας." – "I declare open the Athens Paralympic Games."

— Constantinos Stephanopoulos, President of the Hellenic Republic

The paralympic flame was lit by Georgios Toptsis, a pioneer athlete in Greece. Toptsis was won three medals (one silver and two bronze) between the 1988 and 1996 Games.

== Closing ceremony ==
The closing ceremony for the 2004 Summer Paralympics took place on 28 September 2004. The traditional cultural display was removed from the ceremony as a mark of respect for the deaths of seven teenagers from Farkadona, travelling to Athens, whose bus collided with a truck near the town of Kamena Vourla.

"The Athens Olympics Organising Committee [ATHOC] has decided to cancel the closing ceremony of the 12th Athens Paralympics as initially planned and scheduled because of the tragic accident that cost the life of pupils. The artistic and entertainment part of the ceremony will not take place." (official statement)

Flags were flown at half mast and a minute's silence was observed. In contrast with the formal nature of the opening ceremony, the athletes entered the stadium for the final time as a collective. This was followed by official matters, including the handover to Beijing, hosts of the 2008 Summer Paralympics, and a cultural presentation by the delegation (which included a presentation of the new Paralympic "agitos" emblem). A procession of young people then made their way to join the athletes in the centre of the stadium carrying paper lanterns, before the Paralympic flame was extinguished.

== Calendar ==
In the following calendar for the 2004 Summer Paralympics, each blue box represents an event competition. The yellow boxes represent days during which medal-awarding finals for a sport were held. The number in each yellow box represents the number of finals that were contested on that day. The dots inside each box indicate that there was competition that day.

Legend for colors in events table below
●	Opening ceremony	Event competitions	Event finals	●	Closing ceremony

Competition events by sport and day
September	Fri 17th	Sat 18th	Sun 19th	Mon 20th	Tue 21st	Wed 22nd	Thu 23rd	Fri 24th	Sat 25th	Sun 26th	Mon 27th	Tue 28th	Gold medals
Ceremonies	OC											CC	—N/a
Archery					●	●	●	●	5	2			7
Athletics			22	21	21	22	18	17	26	24	23		194
Boccia							●	●	●	4	●	3	7
Cycling Track		3	4	4	2	3							16
Cycling Road								3	●		12		15
Equestrian					2	2	2	2		1			9
Football 5-a-side		●		●		●		●		●		1	1
Football 7-a-side			●		●		●		●		1		1
Goalball				●	●	●	●	●	●	2			2
Judo		4	4	5									13
Powerlifting				3	4	2		3	4	2	2		20
Sailing		●	●	●	●	●	2						2
Shooting		2	2	2	2	2	2						12
Sitting volleyball					●	●	●	●	●	●	2		2
Swimming			19	20	20	19	13	18	18	29	18		166
Table tennis		●	●	●	17		●	●	●	●	11		28
Wheelchair basketball		●	●	●	●	●	●	●	●	●	●	2	2
Wheelchair fencing				4	2	4	2	2	1				15
Wheelchair rugby		●	●	●		●	●	1					1
Wheelchair tennis				●	●	●	●	1	3	2			6
Total	0	9	51	59	70	54	41	49	58	64	70	6	517

== Media coverage ==
Although the Paralympic Games were broadcast to around 1.6 billion viewers throughout 49 countries, some controversy was caused when no American television network stayed to broadcast the event. This resulted in some US viewers having to wait almost two months until the coverage was broadcast, compared with live feeds in several other countries.

=== Paralympic Media Awards ===
The BBC won the best broadcaster award.

== Sports ==
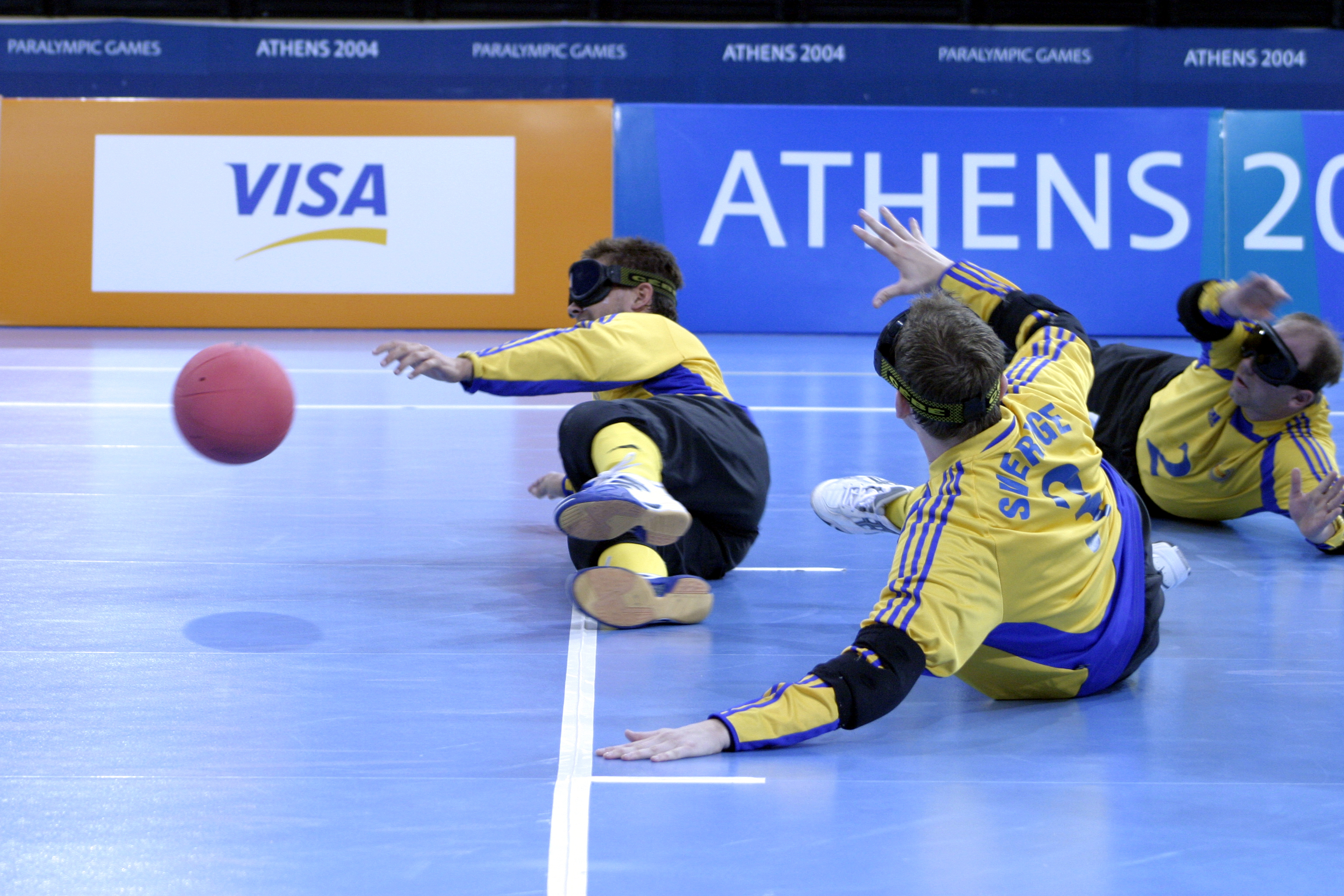
The Swedish men's goalball team at the 2004 Paralympic Games; the team won a silver medal

Following a scandal at the 2000 Summer Paralympics, in which the Spanish intellectually-disabled basketball team was stripped of their gold medal after it was found that multiple players had not met the eligibility requirements, ID-class events were suspended. During the IPC General Assembly held in December 2001, the IPC decided to remove events for the intellectually disabled and make several changes to other classifications of different events. In addition, the IPC also expanded the number of events for women in various sports such as judo and sitting volleyball (in which the standing event was replaced)There was also an expansion of events in wheelchair tennis with the addition of the open tournament for quads with the addition of the singles and doubles events. A new team event was also added in the program: 5-a-side football for the blind.

In total, 43 fewer events were played than in Sydney. However, with 16 being played for the first time and five being replaced. As a result, 32 fewer finals were held than Sydney, totaling 519 finals.

- Archery (7)
- Athletics (194)
- Boccia (7)
- Paralympic cycling
  - Road (15)
  - Track (16)
- Equestrian (9)
- Football 5-a-side (1)
- Football 7-a-side (1)
- Goalball (2)
- Judo (13)
- Powerlifting (20)
- Sailing (2)
- Shooting (12)
- Swimming (166)
- Table tennis (28)
- Volleyball (2)
- Wheelchair basketball (2)
- Wheelchair fencing (15)
- Wheelchair rugby (1)
- Wheelchair tennis (6)

== Venues ==
Facilities of the 2004 Summer Paralympics in the Greater Athens area. Navigate the map for other facilities.

In total 15 venues were used at the 2004 Summer Olympics. Unlike the Olympic Games, the swimming events were held in the Athens Olympic Aquatic Centre indoor pool.

=== Athens Olympic Sports Complex (OAKA) ===
- Indoor Pool of Athens Olympic Aquatic Centre – swimming
- Athens Olympic Tennis Centre – tennis
- Athens Olympic Velodrome – cycling (track)
- Olympic Indoor Hall – Wheelchair basketball
- Olympic Stadium – ceremonies (opening/ closing), athletics

=== Hellinikon Olympic Complex (HOK) ===
- Fencing Hall – Wheelchair Fencing, Sitting Volleyball
- Helliniko Indoor Arena – Wheelchair Rugby
- Olympic Baseball Centre – archery
- Olympic Hockey Centre – Football 5-a-side, Football 7-a-side,

=== Faliro Coastal Zone Olympic Complex ===
- Faliro Sports Pavilion Arena – goalball

=== Markopoulo ===
- Markopoulo Olympic Equestrian Centre – equestrian
- Markopoulo Olympic Shooting Centre – shooting

=== Standalone Venues ===
- Ano Liossia Olympic Hall – boccia, judo
- Panathinaiko Stadium – marathon (finish)
- Vouliagmeni Olympic Centre- road cycling
- Agios Kosmas Olympic Sailing Centre – sailing

== Participating nations ==
Athletes from 135 National Paralympic Committees competed in the Athens 2004 Paralympics. 12 National Paralympic Committees made their dèbut at the Paralympic Games: Bangladesh, Botswana, Cape Verde, Central African Republic, Ghana, Guinea, Nepal, Nicaragua, Niger, Suriname, Tajikistan and Uzbekistan competed for the first time. Five National Paralympic Committees that sent delegations to Sydney 2000 did not send delegation to Athens for various reasons and they were: Laos, Madagascar, Mali, Papua New Guinea, and Vanuatu. In Athens there was also no group of independent or neutral athletes.

- Afghanistan (3)
- Algeria (18)
- Angola (4)
- Argentina (55)
- Armenia (2)
- Australia (152)
- Austria (44)
- Azerbaijan (9)
- Bahrain (5)
- Bangladesh (1)
- Barbados (1)
- Belarus (33)
- Belgium (25)
- Benin (2)
- Bermuda (2)
- Bosnia and Herzegovina (15)
- Botswana (1)
- Brazil (96)
- Bulgaria (9)
- Cambodia (2)
- Canada (146)
- Cape Verde (3)
- Central African Republic (1)
- Chile (4)
- China (198)
- Chinese Taipei (25)
- Colombia (5)
- Costa Rica (1)
- Ivory Coast (2)
- Croatia (17)
- Cuba (24)
- Cyprus (5)
- Czech Republic (65)
- Denmark (32)
- Dominican Republic (2)
- Ecuador (4)
- Egypt (46)
- El Salvador (2)
- Estonia (6)
- Ethiopia (1)
- Faroe Islands (1)
- Fiji (2)
- Finland (54)
- France (136)
- Germany (212)
- Ghana (3)
- Great Britain (167)
- Greece (124) (host)
- Guatemala (2)
- Guinea (1)
- Honduras (2)
- Hong Kong (24)
- Hungary (37)
- Iceland (3)
- India (12)
- Indonesia (3)
- Iran (89)
- Iraq (8)
- Ireland (42)
- Israel (24)
- Italy (76)
- Jamaica (4)
- Japan (162)
- Jordan (10)
- Kazakhstan (8)
- Kenya (16)
- Kuwait (14)
- Kyrgyzstan (3)
- Latvia (7)
- Lesotho (2)
- Libya (2)
- Liechtenstein (1)
- Lithuania (20)
- Macau (1)
- Macedonia (3)
- Malaysia (19)
- Mauritania (1)
- Mauritius (2)
- Mexico (77)
- Moldova (3)
- Mongolia (3)
- Morocco (10)
- Namibia (1)
- Nepal (1)
- Netherlands (95)
- New Zealand (36)
- Nicaragua (1)
- Niger (1)
- Nigeria (14)
- Norway (34)
- Oman (2)
- Pakistan (9)
- Palestine (2)
- Panama (2)
- Peru (5)
- Philippines (2)
- Poland (104)
- Portugal (29)
- Puerto Rico (2)
- Qatar (2)
- Romania (2)
- Russia (84)
- Rwanda (2)
- Samoa (2)
- Saudi Arabia (6)
- Senegal (2)
- Serbia and Montenegro (5)
- Singapore (7)
- Slovakia (37)
- Slovenia (28)
- South Africa (51)
- South Korea (82)
- Spain (158)
- Sri Lanka (6)
- Sudan (2)
- Suriname (2)
- Sweden (41)
- Switzerland (41)
- Syria (5)
- Tajikistan (1)
- Tanzania (1)
- Thailand (43)
- Tonga (1)
- Tunisia (22)
- Turkey (9)
- Turkmenistan (4)
- Uganda (2)
- Ukraine (88)
- United Arab Emirates (10)
- United States (237)
- Uruguay (3)
- Uzbekistan (1)
- Venezuela (16)
- Vietnam (4)
- Zimbabwe (2)

== See also ==
- Summer Paralympics
- Paralympics
- International Paralympic Committee
- 2004 Summer Olympics

Preceded by Sydney	Summer Paralympics; Athens; XII Paralympic Summer Games (2004)	Succeeded by Beijing
