= Bimal Tarafdar =

Bangladeshi sprinter

Bimal Chandra Tarafdar
Personal information
- Nationality: Bangladeshi
- Born: 6 July 1974 (age 51)

Sport
- Sport: Track and field
- Event: Sprints

Bimal Chandra Tarafdar (born 6 July 1974) is a former Bangladeshi sprinter. He won the gold medal in the 100-metres sprint in the 1991 South Asian Games in Colombo.

Tarafdar competed in the men's 100m competition at the 1996 Summer Olympics. He recorded a 10.98, not enough to qualify for the next round past the heats. His personal best is 10.57, set in 1996.
