= Sonia Khatun =

Bangladeshi swimmer (born 1999)

Mst Sonia Khatun (born 10 September 1999) is a Bangladeshi swimmer. She represented Bangladesh at the 2024 Summer Olympics, where she competed in the women's 50m freestyle as the only female athlete from Bangladesh. She placed 64th out of 79 swimmers in the event. Prior to taking part in the Olympics, Khatun criticized Bangladeshi athletics for not investing in athletes success, including better training facilities so Bangladesh would not have to keep relying on universality place rules. In an interview ahead of the Games in response to being asked why Bangladesh has no swimming medals she said, "We have a lot of weaknesses such as we don’t do the long-term camp, we can’t do camp during the winter as we have some issue arranging warm water. Also, we don’t have any indoor swimming pool, so we can’t continue our practice during the natural disaster. Our equipment is not updated. We have to depend on the federation or our agencies for the updated equipment as those are very costly. And of course, the scholarship, I think they should give two scholarships – one for male and one for female."
