= Bangladesh Rowing Federation =

Governing body of rowing in Bangladesh

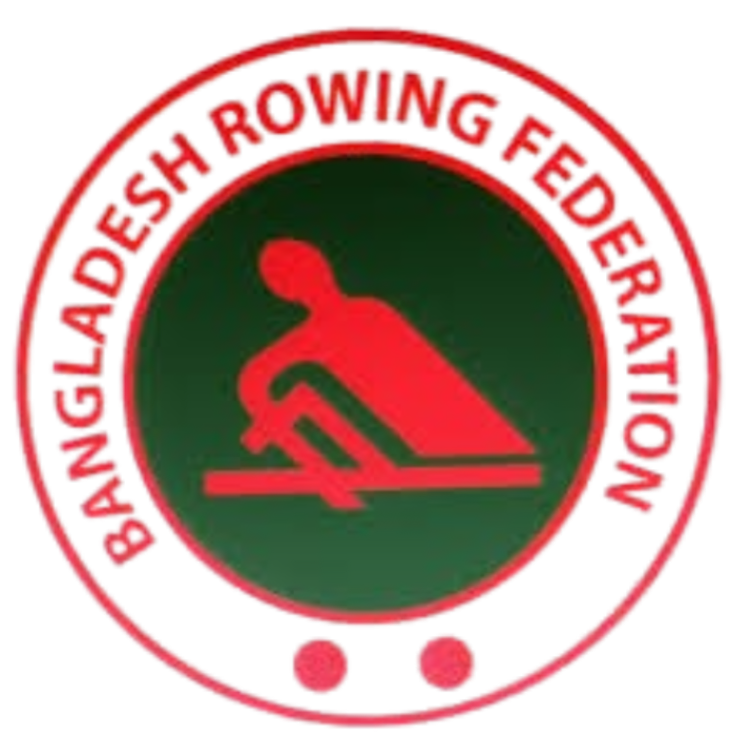

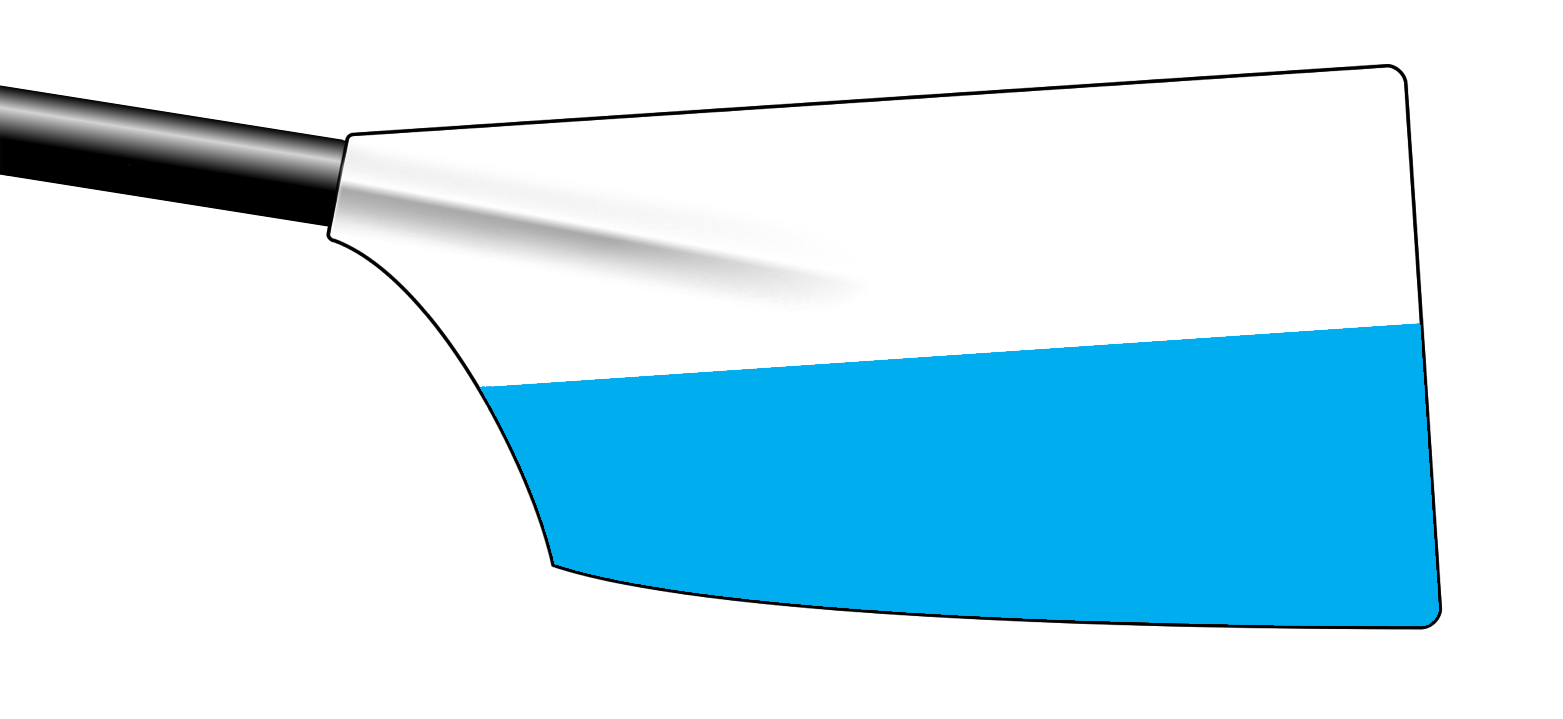
- Rowing blade of Bangladesh
- Formation: 1974
- Headquarters: National Stadium VIP Gate 2 2nd floor room No 33 Dhaka, Bangladesh
- Region served: Bangladesh
- Members: FISA
- Official language: Bengali

The Bangladesh Rowing Federation is the national federation for rowing and is responsible for governing the sport in Bangladesh. Khondokar Md. Mahbubur Rahman is the president, and Maksud Alam is the general secretary of the federation.

On Wednesday, 28th May 2025, the Secretary of the National Sports Council, Md. Aminul Islam, announced this 19-member committee. Additionally, Mosharraf Hossain and Captain SM A Sufiyan Mahmood have been made vice-presidents, while Mostak Ahmed has been appointed as the treasurer and Rashim Mollah as the joint general secretary.

The executive members of the committee are- AHM Mohiuddin, Md. Emdad Hossain Mia, Nasiruzzaman Chowdhury, Aminul Islam Raju, Faizul Islam Ariz, Mohammad Rabbiyullah, Advocate Mu. Kaiyum, Rabiul Alam, Md. Fakhr Uddin Chowdhury, and Syed Shafayeat Hossain.

== History ==
The first boat racing association was formed on Independence Day in 1972. In 1974, the name of the boat races was changed to Bangladesh Rowing Federation. In 1982, the Bangladesh Rowing Federation became a member of the Asian Rowing, International Rowing, and Dragon Federation.
