= Special Olympics Bangladesh =

Disability organization based in Bangladesh

Special Olympics Bangladesh (Bengali: বিশেষ অলিম্পিক বাংলাদেশ) is a national organization in Bangladesh that works with intellectually disabled individuals and help them through participation in sports.

== History ==
Special Olympics Bangladesh was founded in 1994. It works with Special Olympics and has more than 66 thousand registered athletes. Shamim Matin Chowdhury is chairman of the board while Faruqul Islam is the national director. Grameenphone in partnership with Special Olympics launched a talent hunt for disabled athletes in 2008 in Bangladesh. In 2009, Special Olympics Bangladesh organized a two-day training program on field hockey for athletes and trainers.

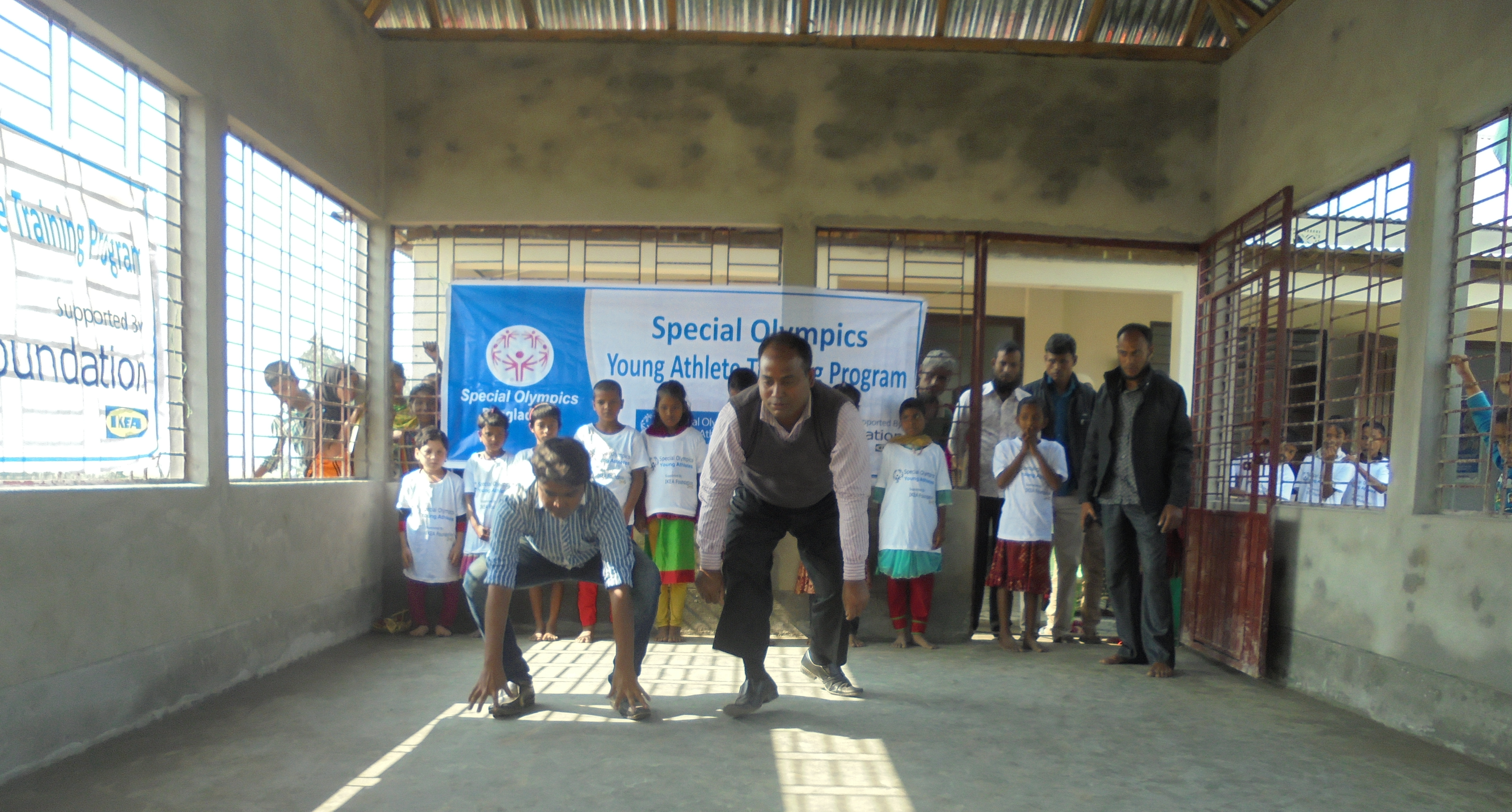
Frog Jump practice of Special Olympics Bangladesh

== Competition ==
The fifth national games of Bangladesh Special Olympics was held in 2010 in the Army Stadium, Dhaka.

In the 2015 Special Olympics the Bangladesh team won 18 gold medals. The team of Special Olympics Bangladesh won 22 gold medals in the 2019 special olympics. 139 athletes participated in the 2019 special olympics in Doha from Bangladesh.
