= Bangladesh at the 2024 Summer Olympics =

- IOC code: BAN
- NOC: Bangladesh Olympic Association
- Website: nocban.org

in Paris, France 26 July 2024 – 11 August 2024
- Competitors: 5 (4 men and 1 woman) in 4 sports
- Flag bearers: Sagor Islam; Sonia Khatun
- Medals: Gold 0 Silver 0 Bronze 0 Total 0

Summer Olympics appearances (overview)
- 1984; 1988; 1992; 1996; 2000; 2004; 2008; 2012; 2016; 2020; 2024; 2028

Other related appearances
- India (1900–pres.); Pakistan (1948–pres.)

Bangladesh competed at the 2024 Summer Olympics in Paris from 26 July to 11 August 2024. This was the nation's eleventh appearance at the Summer Olympics since its official debut at the 1984 Summer Olympics. The Bangladeshi contingent consisted of five athletes competing in four sports. Bangladesh did not win any medals at the Games, and is yet to win an Olympic medal.

== Background ==
The Bangladesh Olympic Association (BOA) was founded in 1979 and recognized by the International Olympic Committee (IOC) on 12 February 1980. However, Bangladesh did not participate in the 1980 Summer Olympics in Moscow, and made its Olympic debut at the 1984 Summer Olympics in Los Angeles. The country has competed at every edition of the Summer Olympic Games since 1984, and the 2024 Games marked its eleventh appearance at the Summer Olympics.

The 2024 Summer Olympics took place in Paris, France from 26 July to 11 August 2024. The Bangladeshi contingent for the Games consisted of 13 members including five athletes and eight officials. Enthekhabul Hamid was appointed as the chef de mission. Archer Sagor Islam and swimmer Sonia Khatun were the flag-bearers for the opening ceremony. Bangladesh did not win any medals at the Games, and is yet to win an Olympic medal.

== Competitors ==
The Bangladeshi contingent consisted of five athletes competing in four sports.

Sport	Men	Women	Total
Archery	1	0	1
Athletics	1	0	1
Shooting	1	0	1
Swimming	1	1	2
Total	4	1	5

== Archery ==
As per the qualification system drawn up by the World Archery, each National Olympic Committee (NOC) was permitted to enter a maximum of six competitors, three per gender. While NOCs that qualify teams for a particular gender are able to send a three-member team to the team event and also have each member compete in the individual event, the remaining individual spots were filled by individual qualification tournaments and world archery rankings.

Sagor Islam secured a place in the men's individual event at the World qualifiers held at Antalya. He was the second archer from Bangladesh to earn a direct qualification for the individual event at the Olympic Games after Ruman Sana in the 2020 Summer Olympics. This was his first Olympic appearance.

The ranking rounds for the archery events were held at the Les Invalides on 25 July. In the men's individual ranking rounds, Islam was seeded 45th with 652 points. In the round of 64, Islam lost to Mauro Nespoli of Italy and did not progress further. Nespoli shot perfect 10s with his first three arrows and took the first set 30-27. In the second set, both were tied at 17 each after the first two arrows, and Islam shot a nine with his final arrow as against Nespoli's perfect score to lose the set. Nespoli won the match after he took the third set 28-25.

Athlete	Event	Ranking round		Round of 64	Round of 32	Round of 16	Quarterfinals	Semifinals	Final / BM	
Athlete	Event	Score	Seed	Opposition Score	Opposition Score	Opposition Score	Opposition Score	Opposition Score	Opposition Score	Rank
Sagor Islam	Men's individual	652	45	Nespoli (ITA); L 0–6	Did not advance					

== Athletics ==
As per World Athletics (WA), a NOC was allowed to enter up to three qualified athletes in each individual event and one qualified relay team if the Olympic Qualifying Standards (OQS) had been met during the qualifying period at the events approved by WA. The remaining places are allocated based on the World Athletics Rankings which were derived from the average of the best five results for an athlete over the designated qualifying period, weighted by the importance of the meet.

Bangladesh sent sprinter Imranur Rahman to compete at the 2024 Summer Olympics. Rahman was born in Sheffield, United Kingdom and made his debut at the Olympics. He is a three time national champion in the men's 100 metres event and held the Bangladesh national record with a time of 10.11 seconds set on 3 September 2023.

The preliminary rounds of the men's 100 metres event was held on 3 August at Stade de France. In Heat 6, he finished sixth with a season's best time of 10.727 seconds. However, he did not qualify for the further rounds.

Track events

Athlete	Event	Preliminary		Heat		Repechage		Semifinal		Final	
Athlete	Event	Time	Rank	Time	Rank	Time	Rank	Time	Rank	Time	Rank
Imranur Rahman	Men's 100 m	10.727 SB	6	Did not advance		—N/a		Did not advance			

Key

- Note– Ranks given for track events are within the athlete's heat only
- Q = Qualified for the next round
- q = Qualified for the next round as a fastest loser

== Shooting ==
As per the International Shooting Sport Federation (ISSF) guidelines, quota places for the Games were allocated to the NOCs based on the results at designated ISSF supervised events held from 14 August 2022 to 9 June 2024. Initial quota places were allocated only to the NOCs, who were allowed to choose the individual shooters. After the initial quotas were allocated, shooters were granted entries based on the ISSF world rankings, which were awarded directly to the individual shooters and were not to be changed by the NOCs.

Bangladesh secured one quota place for the Games in the men's 10 m air rifle event. Robiul Islam made his Olympic debut at the Games. He had represented Bangladesh at the 2022 and 2023 ISSF World Shooting Championships.

The qualification rounds for the men's 10 m air rifle event was held on 28 July at the National Shooting Centre in Châteauroux. Islam finished 43rd amongst the 49 participants with a score of 624.2 and did not advance to the final.

Athlete	Event	Qualification		Final	
Athlete	Event	Points	Rank	Points	Rank
Robiul Islam	Men's 10 m air rifle	624.2	43	Did not advance	

== Swimming ==
As per the World Aquatics guidelines, a NOC was permitted to enter a maximum of two qualified athletes in each individual event, who have achieved the Olympic Qualifying Time. If the quotas were not filled, one athlete per event was allowed to be entered by a NOC if they met the Olympic Selection Time. NOCs were allocated universality places if no one achieved the standard entry times.

Bangladesh was awarded two universality quota places in swimming. Both of them made their debut at the Olympics. Khatun was the only female athlete from Bangladesh at the Games. She set the Bangladesh national record in the 50 metres butterfly event with a time of 30.13 seconds at the 2021 FINA World Swimming Championships in December 2021. Rafi held several swimming national records for Bangladesh in the backstroke, butterfly, and freestyle events.

The swimming events were held at the Paris La Défense Arena. Both the swimmers did not make it to the semifinals, after Rafi was placed 69th after the heats with a time of 53.10 seconds in the men's 100 m freestyle event, and Khatun was placed 69th out of the 79 swimmers in the women's 50 m freestyle event.

Athlete	Event	Heat		Semifinal		Final	
Athlete	Event	Time	Rank	Time	Rank	Time	Rank
Samiul Islam Rafi	Men's 100 m freestyle	53.10	69	Did not advance			
Sonia Khatun	Women's 50 m freestyle	30.52	64	Did not advance			

Qualifiers for the latter rounds (Q) of all events were decided on a time only basis, therefore positions shown are overall results versus competitors in all heats.
