= Bangladesh Taekwondo Federation =

Sports governing body

- Formation: 1997
- Headquarters: Dhaka, Bangladesh
- Region served: Bangladesh
- Official language: Bengali

The Bangladesh Taekwondo Federation is the national federation for taekwondo and is responsible for governing the sport in Bangladesh. Major General Md. Habib Ullah is the president and Lt. Colonel Md. Ershadul Hoque is the general secretary of the federation.

== History ==
Bangladesh Taekwondo Federation was established in 1997. In January 2019, the South Korean government donated equipment to the Bangladesh Taekwondo Federation. In December 2019, Dipu Chakma became the first Bangladeshi to win a gold medal in taekwondo at the 13th South Asian Games, beating opponents from India, Sri Lanka, Pakistan and Nepal.
