= Bazlur Mohamed Rahman =

Bangladeshi swimmer

Personal information
- Native name: বজলুর রহমান
- Nationality: Bangladeshi
- Born: 17 October 1959 (age 66)

Sport
- Sport: Swimming

Bazlur Mohamed Rahman (born 17 October 1959) is a Bangladeshi swimmer. He competed in the men's 100 metre breaststroke at the 1988 Summer Olympics.
