= Saiful Alam (shooter) =

Bangladeshi sports shooter (born 1968)

Personal information
- Born: 28 October 1968 (age 56)

Saiful Alam (born 28 October 1968) is a Bangladeshi sport shooter. He competed in the 10 m air rifle event at the 1996 Summer Olympics, Alam scored 581 points and finished in 33rd position.
