= Bangladesh Boxing Federation =

Boxing federation in Bangladesh

- Formation: 1972
- Headquarters: Dhaka, Bangladesh
- Region served: Bangladesh
- Official language: Bengali
- President: Lt. Colonel M A Latif Khan (Rtd.)
- Secretary: M A Quddus Khan
- Affiliations: International Boxing Association, Asian Boxing Confederation, Bangladesh Olympic Association

The Bangladesh Boxing Federation is the national federation for boxing and is responsible for governing the sport in Bangladesh. Lt. Colonel M A Latif Khan (Rtd.) is the president of the federation.

== History ==
The Bangladesh Amateur Boxing Federation was established in 1972. In 2012, it started a national women's boxing competition.
