= Mohamed Shah Alam =

Bangladeshi sprinter

Personal information
- Nationality: Bangladeshi
- Born: 1 July 1962
- Died: 29 May 1990 (aged 27) Kushtia, Bangladesh

Sport
- Sport: Track and field
- Event: Sprints

Mohamed Shah Alam (1 July 1962 – 29 May 1990) was a Bangladeshi sprinter. He was born in Shahebnagar village located in Gangni upazila of Meherpur district in a family of seven brothers and three sisters. His father Kabir Hossain was a footballer but none of his siblings pursued any sport. According to a report published on sports magazine Krira Jagat in 1990, Shah Alam joined Bangladesh Army as a Sepahi in 1977 and started participating in inter-unit competitions where he gained instant success. In the 100-metres sprint event, he won gold twice in 1985 South Asian Games in Dhaka and in 1987 South Asian Games in Kolkata. Alam competed in the men's 200 metres at the 1988 Summer Olympics. He also competed in the 1990 Commonwealth Games.

Alam was killed in a motorcycle accident on the Kushtia highway near Pabna while returning from Kushtia.
