= Mohammad Mahfizur Rahman =

Bangladeshi swimmer (born 1993)

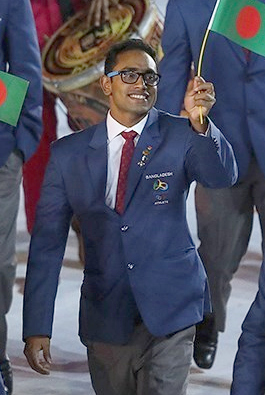
- Rahman at the 2016 Olympics

Personal information
- Born: 15 May 1993 (age 33) Pabna, Bangladesh
- Education: Jahangirnagar University
- Height: 172 cm (5 ft 8 in)
- Weight: 71 kg (157 lb)

Sport
- Sport: Swimming
- Club: Bangladesh Navy
- Coached by: Park Tae Goon
Medal record
Representing Bangladesh
South Asian Games
Silver medal – second place	2010 Dhaka	100m freestyle
Bronze medal – third place	2010 Dhaka	50m freestyle
Bronze medal – third place	2016 Guwahati	50m freestyle
Bronze medal – third place	2016 Guwahati	100m freestyle
Bronze medal – third place	2016 Guwahati	200m freestyle
Bronze medal – third place	2016 Guwahati	1500m freestyle
Bronze medal – third place	2016 Guwahati	4x100m freestyle relay
Bronze medal – third place	2016 Guwahati	4x200m freestyle relay
Bronze medal – third place	2016 Guwahati	4x100m medley relay

Mohammad Mahfizur Rahman (born 15 May 1993) is a Bangladeshi swimmer. He competed in the 50m freestyle event at the 2012 and 2016 Summer Olympics, and was Team Bangladesh national flag bearer at the 2012 Summer Olympics Parade of Nations.

Rahman has a degree in history from Jahangirnagar University. He is on active duty with the Bangladesh Navy.

He is one of the best freestyle swimmers in Bangladesh and currently coaches the students of American International School Dhaka.

Olympic Games
Preceded by Mohammed Rana	Flagbearer for Bangladesh; London 2012	Succeeded by Siddikur Rahman
