= Bangladesh Table Tennis Federation =

Sports governing body

- Formation: 1976
- Headquarters: Dhaka, Bangladesh
- Region served: Bangladesh
- Official language: Bengali

The Bangladesh Table Tennis Federation is the national federation for table tennis and is responsible for governing the sport in Bangladesh. National Professor Jamilur Reza Choudhury was the founder president of the federation.

== History ==
The federation was established in 1972, and became an affiliate of the Asian Table Tennis Federation and World Table Tennis Federation.that year. It is the third most popular sport in the country, after football and cricket. In November 2019, top table tennis players of Bangladesh demanded the resignation of the vice-president of the Bangladesh Table Tennis Federation, Khandokar Hasan Monir, with allegations of mismanagement.
