= Bangladesh Karate Federation =

Sports governing body

- Formation: 1972
- Headquarters: Dhaka, Bangladesh
- Region served: Bangladesh
- Official language: Bengali
- Website: Bangladesh Karate Federation

The Bangladesh Karate Federation is the national federation for karate and is responsible for governing the sport in Bangladesh. Md. Shahjada Alam is the President of Bangladesh Karate Federation. Md. Moazzem Hossain is the Secretary General of the Bangladesh Karate Federation.

== History ==
The Bangladesh Karate Federation was established in 1972 as the Bangladesh Judo and Karate Federation. Bangladesh Judo and Karate Federation divided into two, Bangladesh Karate Federation and Bangladesh Judo Federation, in 2001 by Lieutenant General M Harun-Ar-Rashid.

Japan Overseas Cooperation Volunteers sent Nonka, a karate player, to work with Bangladesh Karate Federation to develop karate in Bangladesh. Mitsuito Yoshido served as the coach of Bangladesh Karate Federation. In 1982, the federation held the first National Karate Championships in Bangladesh. In 2000s, JICA stopped providing coaches and supporting the karate federation.
