= Bangladesh Olympic Association =

National Olympic Committee

- Country: Bangladesh
- Code: BAN
- Created: 1979
- Recognized: 1980
- Continental Association: OCA
- Headquarters: Dhaka, Bangladesh
- President: Waker-Uz-Zaman
- Secretary General: Syed Shahed Reza
- Website: nocban.org

The Bangladesh Olympic Association (Bengali: বাংলাদেশ অলিম্পিক সংস্থা; IOC code: BAN) is the National Olympic Committee representing Bangladesh. It is also the body responsible for Bangladesh's representation at the Commonwealth Games. Its president is the General Waker-Uz-Zaman, OSP SGP psc (born 16 September 1966) a four star general of the Bangladesh Army who is also the current Chief of Army Staff (CAS). Bangladesh is the largest country by population that has not won a single medal at the Olympic Games.

== History ==
Bangladesh Olympic Association was established on 1979. Saidur Rahman Dawn in 1984 competed in the Los Angeles Olympics becoming the first Bangladeshi to participate in the Games. It held its first annual general meeting in 2017. The General assembly was chaired by the president and 49 members of the assembly.

== Affiliated national bodies ==
1. Bangladesh Archery Federation
2. Bangladesh Athletics Federation
3. Bangladesh Badminton Federation
4. Bangladesh Basketball Federation
5. Bangladesh Amateur Boxing Federation
6. Bangladesh Cricket Board
7. Bangladesh Cycling Federation
8. Bangladesh Fencing Association
9. Bangladesh Football Federation
10. Bangladesh Golf Federation
11. Bangladesh Gymnastics Federation
12. Bangladesh Handball Federation
13. Bangladesh Hockey Federation
14. Bangladesh Judo Federation
15. Bangladesh Karate Federation
16. Bangladesh Rowing Federation
17. Bangladesh Shooting Federation
18. Bangladesh Swimming Federation
19. Bangladesh Table Tennis Federation
20. Bangladesh Taekwondo Federation
21. Bangladesh Tennis Federation
22. Bangladesh Volleyball Federation
23. Bangladesh Weightlifting Federation
24. Bangladesh Amateur Wrestling Federation
25. Bangladesh Rugby Federation Union
26. Bangladesh Chess Federation
27. Bangladesh Kabaddi Federation
28. Bangladesh Wushu Federation

== See also ==
- Bangladesh at the Olympics
- Bangladesh at the Commonwealth Games
- Bangladesh at the Asian Games
- Bangladesh at the South Asian Games
- Bangladesh at the 2021 Islamic Solidarity Games
- Bangladesh at the 2025 Islamic Solidarity Games
