= Pakistan at the World Athletics Championships =

- WA code: PAK
- National federation: Athletics Federation of Pakistan
- Medals Ranked 0th: Gold 0 Silver 1 Bronze 0 Total 1

World Athletics Championships appearances (overview)
- 1983; 1987; 1991; 1993; 1995; 1997; 1999; 2001; 2003; 2005; 2007; 2009; 2011; 2013; 2015; 2017; 2019; 2022; 2023; 2025

Pakistan has participated in the World Athletics Championships since 1983. In 2022, Arshad Nadeem became the first Pakistani athlete to reach the final of any event at the World Championships. Pakistan achieved their first and only medal at the 2023 World Athletics Championships when Arshad Nadeem finished second in the men's javelin throw.

== Medalists ==
Medal	Name	Year	Event
Silver	Arshad Nadeem	2023 Budapest	Men's javelin throw

=== By event ===
Event	Gold	Silver	Bronze	Total
Javelin throw	0	1	0	1
Totals (1 entries)	0	1	0	1

=== By gender ===
Gender	Gold	Silver	Bronze	Total
Men	0	1	0	1
Women	0	0	0	0

== Medal tables ==
=== By championships ===
Games	Athletes	Gold	Silver	Bronze	Total	Rank
1983 Helsinki	1	0	0	0	0	–
1987 Rome	did not participate					
1991 Tokyo	1	0	0	0	0	–
1993 Stuttgart	2	0	0	0	0	–
1995 Gothenburg	2	0	0	0	0	–
1997 Athens	1	0	0	0	0	–
1999 Seville	did not participate					
2001 Edmonton	1	0	0	0	0	–
2003 Paris	2	0	0	0	0	–
2005 Helsinki	2	0	0	0	0	–
2007 Osaka	2	0	0	0	0	–
2009 Berlin	2	0	0	0	0	–
2011 Daegu	1	0	0	0	0	–
2013 Moscow	1	0	0	0	0	–
2015 Beijing	1	0	0	0	0	–
2017 London	1	0	0	0	0	–
2019 Doha	1	0	0	0	0	–
2022 Eugene	1	0	0	0	0	–
2023 Budapest	1	0	1	0	1	27
2025 Tokyo	1	0	0	0	0	–
Total		0	1	0	1	96

== See also ==
- Pakistan at the Olympics
- Pakistan at the Paralympics
