= List of Pakistani sportswomen =

List of notable Pakistani female athletes

This List of Pakistani Sportswomen includes Pakistani female sportspersons who have brought laurels to the country at the national or international stage.

- Amina Wali, Skiing – Silver medallist, Giant Slalom, inaugural South Asian Winter Games; first Pakistani woman to win an international skiing medal (alongside her sister Ifrah Wali).
- Anita Karim, Mixed martial arts – First internationally recognised Pakistani female MMA fighter; 7 gold medals and 1 silver at the Pakistan Grappling Challenge (2017–18). Won the first professional women's MMA title in Pakistan, defeating Iran's Parisa Shamsabadi via first-round knockout at the Infinite Championship in the 52kg category in 2026.
- Asteria de Sa, Athletics – Pakistan's first national champion in the long jump; represented Sindh at the 1st Pakistan Olympics (National Games), Karachi.
- Ayesha Ayaz, Taekwondo – Bronze medallist, 7th Fujairah Taekwondo Open Championship (2019); one of Pakistan's youngest international taekwondo practitioners.
- Ayesha Baloch, Wrestling – Won the gold medal in wrestling at the 2026 Asian Games, defeating India's Shreya Sai in the final; also a silver medallist at the World Martial Arts Games and a three-time national boxing gold medallist.
- Bismah Maroof, Cricket – Former captain, Pakistan women's national cricket team (2017–2023); conferred with Tamgha-e-Imtiaz (2023).
- Bisma Khan, Swimming – competed in the 2020 Summer Olympics, setting a national 50m freestyle record of 27.78 seconds, and won a silver medal at the 2019 South Asian Games, dominated the 2023 National Games by winning eight gold medals and secured a bronze at the 2017 Islamic Solidarity Games.
- Faiqa Riaz, Athletics (100m) – Pakistan national 100m champion; represented Pakistan at the 2024 Paris Olympics.
- Fatima Sana, Cricket – Women's Emerging Cricketer of the Year 2021 award, first Pakistani woman to sign a contract in The Hundred. Holds the world record for the fastest half-century in Women's T20I history, reaching the milestone in just 15 balls against Zimbabwe in May 2026. She became the first captain (male or female) to score a half-century and take three wickets in the same Women's T20 World Cup match, achieving the feat against South Africa in June 2026. She signed with the Perth Scorchers for the 2026 WBBL, becoming only the second Pakistani player to feature in the competition.
- Fatima Zahra, Amateur boxing – won a bronze medal at the 2025 Islamic Solidarity Games, becoming the first Pakistani woman to claim an international multi-sport boxing medal. bronze medal at the 2026 Commonwealth Games, becoming Pakistan's first female Commonwealth Games medalist and the first Pakistani woman to win a boxing medal at the Commonwealth Games.
- Hajra Khan, Football – Former captain, Pakistan women's national football team (2014-2022); first Pakistani woman to sign a professional international football contract (Maldives, 2014); Pride of Performance Award (2022).
- Ifrah Wali, Skiing – Gold medallist, Giant Slalom, inaugural South Asian Winter Games.
- Iram Khanam, Powerlifting – A Lady Inspector in the Rawalpindi Police who won two gold medals at the World Powerlifting Championship 2025 in Sri Lanka, defeating top Indian competitors in both the powerlifting and deadlift events.
- Jehanara Nabi, Swimming – Multiple national record holder; competed in the 200m freestyle at the 2024 Paris Olympics.
- Kainat Imtiaz, Cricket – Gold medallist, 2010 Asian Games (women's cricket).
- Kiran Baluch, Cricket – Holder of the all-time world record for the highest individual score in women's Test cricket: 242 vs. West Indies, Karachi, March 2004.
- Kiran Khan, Swimming – first Pakistani woman to win a gold medal at the South Asian Swimming Championship, a 22-time National Champion, holds a record for winning 15 gold medals in a single National Championship tournament, accumulated a massive tally of 370 national gold medals and 9 international gold medals with 85 international medals overall, represented Pakistan at the 2008 Beijing Olympics.
- Kishmala Talat, Shooting (10m air pistol) – First Pakistani woman to directly qualify for the Olympic Games via shooting qualification; bronze medallist at 2022 Asian Games, first Pakistani shooter to win medal at the Asian Games; silver medallist, 2019 South Asian Games.
- Kulsoom Hazara, Karate – 6 medals at the South Asian Games; gold medallist, South Asian Karate Championship.
- Laura Akram, Boxing – Secured Pakistan's first-ever world-level medal in elite women's boxing, winning bronze at the World Boxing Challenge (part of the Grand Prix Ústí nad Labem) in the 57kg category in 2025; also the reigning Pakistan National Champion.
- Lianna Swan, Swimming - won a gold medal in the 200m breaststroke at the 2016 South Asian Games and held 11 Pakistani national records, represented Pakistan at the 2016 Rio Olympics, the Commonwealth Games, and multiple World Championships.
- Mahoor Shahzad, Badminton - first Pakistani badminton player to compete at the Olympics (Tokyo 2020), achieved career-best world ranking of No. 138, the first Pakistani female badminton player to do so, dominated the Pakistan National Championship eight consecutive times, won a gold medal at the Pakistan International Series, a silver medal at the Kenya International Badminton Series, and a bronze medal in the team event at the 2019 South Asian Games.
- Mahnoor Ali, Squash – Ranked 2nd in Asian U-13 (2024); gold medallist, U-13 title, US Junior Open (December 2024).
- Mahin Aftab Qureshi, Tennis – Won the First Meinhardt Grade A+ National Ranking Championships singles title in 2026 and the Asian U-14 Division 2 singles title in 2015, becoming the first Pakistani female to achieve the latter.
- Maria Bibi, Athletics – Broke the national record in the women's 5,000m at the 54th National Athletics Championship in October 2026, clocking 19:02.00 to surpass Rabia Ashiq's 2012 record.
- Maria Toorpakai Wazir, Squash – First girl from Waziristan in international squash; bronze medallist, 2009 World Junior Squash Championships.
- Manesha Ali, Mixed martial arts – Won the gold medal at the IMMAF World Cup in Luanda, Angola, in 2026, defeating the host nation's two-time African champion, Leonela Isabel Blaiye, via a second-round standing guillotine submission.
- Mehwish Ali, Squash – Topped Pakistan's U-19 women's squash ranking (2024); gold medallist, U-17 category, Hungary Junior Open (2024).
- Minhal Sohail, Shooting – first female shooter to represent Pakistan at the Olympics when she participated in the 2016 Rio Games.
- Mia Nuriah Freudweiler, Skiing – the first Pakistani to compete in a Winter Youth Olympic Games after qualifying for the 2020 Winter Youth Olympics.
- Najma Parveen, Athletics – first female athlete to represent Pakistan in two Olympics, current national record holder in 200m, 400m and 400m hurdles.
- Nargis Hameedullah, Karate – first-ever Pakistani athlete to win a karate medal at the Asian Games, securing a bronze medal in 2018, a gold at the 2017 South Asian Karate Championship, serves as the first female karate instructor in Quetta.
- Naila Kiani, Mountaineering – First Pakistani woman to summit 12 of the 14 eight-thousanders; fastest Pakistani to summit 11 eight-thousanders in under three years; conferred with Sitara-e-Imtiaz (2024).
- Naseem Hameed, Athletics (100m) – Titled "Fastest Woman of South Asia"; gold medallist, 100m, 2010 South Asian Games (11.81s); appointed Pakistan's Ambassador of Sports by President Asif Ali Zardari (2010); founder of Naseem Hameed Sports Academy.
- Nida Dar, Cricket – First bowler to take 100 T20I wickets for Pakistan (2021); most capped Pakistan women's T20I cricketer; Pride of Performance Award (2022).
- Parveen Ahmed, Tennis - first Pakistani woman to compete at a Grand Slam tennis tournament.
- Palwasha Bashir, Badminton – Bronze medallist, South Asian Games.
- Rabia Ashiq, Athletics (800m) – Competed in the 800m at the 2012 London Olympics; multiple Pakistan national 800m champion.
- Rabia Shahzad, Powerlifting – Three-time Pakistan national champion; set a world record (267.5 kg total, 52kg category) at the 2022 World Powerlifting Championship, Trnava, Slovakia.
- Rubab Raza, Swimming – First Pakistani female Olympic swimmer; competed in the 50m freestyle at the 2004 Athens Olympics aged 13; two silvers and a bronze at the 2004 South Asian Games.
- Sadaf Siddiqui, Athletics - (100m, 2008 Summer Olympics), Silver in 100m at 2006 South Asian Games.
- Saleema Imtiaz, Cricket (Umpiring) – First Pakistani woman nominated to the ICC International Panel of Development Umpires (September 2024); began her umpiring career with the PCB Women's Umpires Panel in 2008.
- Samar Khan, Cycling / Snowboarding – First woman in the world to cycle on the Biafo Glacier (2016); first Pakistani woman to summit and snowboard down Mount Elbrus (2024).
- Samina Baig, Mountaineering – First Pakistani woman to summit Mount Everest (2013), complete the Seven Summits (2014), and summit K2 (2022); UNDP Pakistan National Goodwill Ambassador (2018).
- Sana Bahadur, Squash – Became the first Pakistani woman to win a PSA Tour title after defeating former World No. 1 Rachael Grinham in the final of the Bendigo Open 2026 in Australia; born deaf and mute, she has broken significant barriers in the sport.
- Sana Mir, Cricket – Former captain (137 international matches); Tamgha-e-Imtiaz (2012); first Pakistani woman inducted into the ICC Cricket Hall of Fame (2025).
- Sadaf Shamas, Cricket – Became the first Pakistan Women's batter to score 50-plus in four consecutive ODI innings, achieving the feat in 2026.
- Sehar Sohail, Weightlifting – Gold medallist at a Weightlifting Championship in South Africa (2024, 52kg).
- Shabana Akhtar, Athletics – First Pakistani woman to compete at the Olympic Games (long jump, 1996 Summer Olympics, Atlanta); 42-time Pakistan national champion (1989–1998).
- Shaiza Khan, Cricket – Founding captain, Pakistan women's national cricket team.
- Shazia Hidayat, Athletics (1500m) – Second Pakistani woman to compete at the Olympic Games (1500m, 2000 Summer Olympics, Sydney).
- Sumaira Zahoor, Athletics - (1500m, 2004 Summer Olympics), Silver medallist in 1500m at the 2005 Women's Islamic Games and 2004 South Asian Games.
- Sybil Sohail, Weightlifting – First Pakistani woman to win gold at the Asian Weightlifting Championship (Doha, 59kg category); Commonwealth powerlifting champion.
- Twinkle Sohail, Powerlifting – First Pakistani woman to win international gold in powerlifting (Asian Bench Press Championship, Oman, 2015); Commonwealth powerlifting champion.
- Ushna Suhail, Tennis – Pakistan's highest-ranked female player and the country's only woman to achieve a WTA ranking; conferred with the Tamgha-e-Imtiaz in 2023 and the first Pakistani to receive the ITF Billie Jean King Cup Commitment Award.
- Veronica Sohail, Weightlifting – Gold medallist at a Weightlifting Championship in South Africa (2024, 57kg).
- Zainab Khan, Karate – Became the first Pakistani woman to win a gold medal in full-contact Kyokushin karate at the 5th World Karate Championship in Riyadh in 2025, competing against 750 fighters from 40 countries.

== See also ==
- Pakistan at the Olympics
- Pakistan women's national cricket team
- Women's sport in Pakistan
