= List of Pakistani records in athletics =

The following are the national records in athletics in Pakistan maintained by the Athletics Federation of Pakistan (AFP).

== Outdoor ==
Key to tables: Awaiting ratification Record not kept by AFP Not ratified or later rescinded by AFP

=== Men ===
Event	Record	Athlete	Date	Meet	Place	Ref..
100 m	10.37 (±0.0 m/s)	Shajar Abbas	13 July 2023	Asian Championships	Bangkok, Thailand	
100 m	10.1 h	Liaquat Ali	20 April 2011	Pakistani Championships	Lahore, Pakistan	
200 m	20.87 (+1.7 m/s)	Shajar Abbas	26 June 2022	Qosanov Memorial	Almaty, Kazakhstan	
200 m	20.3 h NWI	Shajar Abbas	27 November 2022	Pakistani Championships	Lahore, Pakistan	
200 m	20.7 h (Note: By World Athletics source; 20.65 by other sources.)	Liaquat Ali	5 April 2015	Pakistani Championships	Islamabad, Pakistan	
200 m	20.8 h	Maqsood Ahmad	14 March 2001		Lahore, Pakistan	
400 m	46.73	Abdul Mueed Baloch	29 May 2022	2nd Imam Reza Cup	Mashhad, Iran	
800 m	1:48.10	Muhammad Siddique	28 July 1974		Hannover, West Germany	
1500 m	3:41.4 h	Muhammad Younis	11 August 1970		Cologne, West Germany	
2000 m	5:09.7 h	Muhammad Younis	28 July 1977		Dormagen, West Germany	
3000 m	8:05.65	Muhammad Younis	18 September 1971		Dormagen, West Germany	
5000 m	14:08.4 h	Muhammad Younis	22 July 1977		Troisdorf, West Germany	
5000 m	14:00.78	Talha Syed	20 April 2023	Virginia Challenge	Charlottesville, United States	
10,000 m	30:27.2 h	Mazhar Hussain	2 August 1977		Troisdorf, West Germany	
10,000 m	28:42.00	Talha Syed	28 March 2024	Raleigh Relays	Raleigh, United States	
Half marathon	1:07:07	Sohail Amir	11 November 2023	Asian Half Marathon Championships	Dubai, United Arab Emirates	
Marathon	2:14:11	Naseer Ahmed	19 October 2003		Rawalpindi, Pakistan	
110 m hurdles	14.11 NWI	Ghulam Abbas	21 October 1989		Islamabad, Pakistan	
110 m hurdles	13.85 NWI (Note: ratified by AFP but not recognised by World Athletics)	Mohsin Ali	22 March 2012	Pakistani Championships	Islamabad, Pakistan	
110 m hurdles	13.74 h	Mohsin Ali	19 May 2012	Pakistani Championships	Islamabad, Pakistan	
110 m hurdles	13.77	Muhammad Sajjad Ahmad	19 May 2012	Pakistani Championships	Islamabad, Pakistan	
400 m hurdles	49.90	Mohammad Amin	11 October 1994	Asian Games	Hiroshima, Japan	
3000 m steeplechase	8:42.43	Abdul Razzaq	21 October 1989	South Asian Games	Islamabad, Pakistan	
High jump	2.14 m	Sharoz Khan	12 August 2022	Islamic Solidarity Games	Konya, Turkey	
Pole vault	4.91 m	Adnan Anjum	7 July 2010	Pakistani Championships	Islamabad, Pakistan	
Pole vault	4.93 m	Jaffar Ashraf	25 November 2022	Pakistani Championships	Lahore, Pakistan	
Pole vault	4.94 m	Jaffar Ashraf	6 December 2023	Pakistani Championships	Attock, Pakistan	
Long jump	7.79 m	Mohammad Urfaq	21 October 1989	South Asian Games	Islamabad, Pakistan	
Triple jump	16.45 m	Zafar Iqbal	12 April 2007		Karachi, Pakistan	
Shot put	18.25 m	Ghufran Hussain	21 May 2000		Karachi, Pakistan	
Discus throw	55.10 m	Basharat Ali	26 August 2006	South Asian Games	Colombo, Sri Lanka	
Hammer throw	68.20 m	Aqarab Abbas	23 November 1995		Islamabad, Pakistan	
Javelin throw	92.97 m	Arshad Nadeem	8 August 2024	Olympic Games	Paris, France	
Decathlon	6747 pts h	Ghulam Abbas	14-15 March 2001		Lahore, Pakistan	
Decathlon	100m (wind) / Long jump (wind) / Shot put / High jump / 400m / 110m H (wind) / Discus / Pole vault / Javelin / 1500m					
20 km walk (road)	1:46:12	Faizan Khan	11 November 2019	National Games	Peshawar, Pakistan	
20 km walk (road)	1:40:11 (Note: recognised by World Athletics but not ratified by AFP)	Kajal Khan	18 February 1971		Rawalpindi, Pakistan	
50 km walk (road)	4:03:43	Hasnat Haider	14 August 2017		Lahore, Pakistan	
4 × 100 m relay	40.24	Team Army; Muhammad Shahbaz; Liaqat Ali; Ubaid Ali; Ahmad Uzair	11 May 2016	Pakistani Championships	Quetta, Pakistan	
4 × 100 m relay	40.2 h	Pakistan; A. Liaqat; M. Imran; Afzal Baig; M. Shabbaz	13 April 2007		Karachi, Pakistan	
4 × 400 m relay	3:07.03	Pakistan; M.A. Saeed; B. Munir; A. Majeed; Saghir Ahmad	6 April 2004	South Asian Games	Islamabad, Pakistan	

=== Women ===
Event	Record	Athlete	Date	Meet	Place	Ref.
100 m	11.81 NWI	Sadaf Siddiqui	22 April 2008		Lahore, Pakistan	
100 m	11.81 (+1.1 m/s)	Naseem Hameed	8 February 2010	South Asian Games	Dhaka, Bangladesh	
200 m	23.69 A (+0.7 m/s)	Najma Parveen	4 December 2019	South Asian Games	Kathmandu, Nepal	
400 m	53.63	Najma Parveen	11 November 2019	National Games	Peshawar, Pakistan (Note: by World Athletics source; Chennai, India (location of former record) by AFP source, a typo)	
800 m	2:08.04	Bushra Parveen	26 August 2006	South Asian Games	Colombo, Sri Lanka	
1500 m	4:31.41	Sumaira Zahoor	5 April 2004	South Asian Games	Islamabad, Pakistan	
3000 m	10:23.36 (Note: ratified by AFP but not recognised by World Athletics)	Kiran Rana	6 April 2013	Indian Grand Prix	Patiala, India	
3000 m	11:01.95 (Note: recognised by World Athletics but not ratified by AFP)	Myra Nur Lakdawala	22 April 2017	Bulldog Invitational	Fresno, United States	
5000 m	19:04.0 h	Rabia Ashiq	20 May 2012	Pakistani Championships	Islamabad, Pakistan	
5000 m	19:03.10 (Note: recognised by World Athletics but not ratified by AFP)	Myra Nur Lakdawala	25 February 2017	Johnny Mathis Invitational	San Francisco, United States	
5 km (road)	22:30+	Sara Tahoor	24 September 2023	Berlin Marathon	Berlin, Germany	
10,000 m	40:42.7 h	Rabia Ashiq	21 April 2011	Pakistani Championships	Lahore, Pakistan	
10 km (road)	44:49+	Sara Tahoor	24 September 2023	Berlin Marathon	Berlin, Germany	
15 km (road)	1:07:25+	Sara Tahoor	24 September 2023	Berlin Marathon	Berlin, Germany	
20 km (road)	1:30:16+	Sara Tahoor	24 September 2023	Berlin Marathon	Berlin, Germany	
Half marathon	1:33:56	Farhat Bano	20 January 2023	Bangabandhu International Half Marathon	Dhaka, Bangladesh	
25 km (road)	1:53:16+	Sara Tahoor	24 September 2023	Berlin Marathon	Berlin, Germany	
30 km (road)	2:17:12+	Sara Tahoor	24 September 2023	Berlin Marathon	Berlin, Germany	
Marathon	4:12:36	Sadia Parveen	24 February 2002	Hong Kong Marathon	Hong Kong	
Marathon	4:02:20	Rabia Naeem	8 October 2017	Chicago Marathon	Chicago, United States	
Marathon	3:39:56 (Note: recognised by World Athletics but not ratified by AFP)	Zeenat Mansoor	3 November 2019	New York City Marathon	New York City, United States	
Marathon	3:17:41	Sara Tahoor	24 September 2023	Berlin Marathon	Berlin, Germany	
100 m hurdles	14.66 NWI	Ghazala Ramzan	11 November 2019	National Games	Peshawar, Pakistan	
400 m hurdles	1:00.35	Najma Parveen	6 December 2019	South Asian Games	Kathmandu, Nepal	
3000 m steeplechase						
High jump	1.69 m A	Rehana Kausar	27 September 1999	South Asian Games	Kathmandu, Nepal	
Pole vault	3.15 m	Sidra Bashir	11 November 2019	National Games	Peshawar, Pakistan	
Long jump	6.31 m NWI	Shabana Akhtar	26 December 1995	South Asian Games	Chennai, India	
Triple jump	12.25 m NWI	Maria Maratab	11 November 2019	National Games	Peshawar, Pakistan	
Shot put	14.57 m	Zeenat Parveen	12 August 2005		Islamabad, Pakistan	
Discus throw	38.17 m	Kalsoom Shahzadi	20 November 2000		Islamabad, Pakistan	
Hammer throw	45.03 m	Razia Sultana	11 August 2005		Islamabad, Pakistan	
Javelin throw	44.78 m	Parveen Akhtar	6 July 2010	Pakistani Championships	Karachi, Pakistan	
Heptathlon	4278 pts h (Note: by AFP source, 4225 pts by World Athletics source because of windy conditions)	Maria Maratab	12–13 November 2019 (Note: by AFP source, 13–14 November 2019 by World Athletics source)	National Games	Peshawar, Pakistan	
Heptathlon	100m H (wind) / High jump / Shot put / 200m (wind) / Long jump (wind) / Javelin / 800m; 14.8 h (NWI) / 1.50 m / 8.13 m / 26.8 h (NWI) / 5.45 m (NWI) / 23.04 m / 2:36.0 h					
20 km walk (road)						
35 km walk (road)						
50 km walk (road)						
4 × 100 m relay	46.74 (Note: not ratified by AFP but recognised by World Athletics)	Sahib-e-Asra; Najma Parveen; Aneela Gulzar; Esha Imran	4 December 2019	South Asian Games	Kathmandu, Nepal	
4 × 100 m relay	47.0 h	Pakistan; Najma Parveen; Sahib-e-Asra; Shafaq; Musarat	12 November 2019	National Games	Peshawar, Pakistan	
4 × 400 m relay	3:41.74 (Note: not ratified by AFP but recognised by World Athletics)	Sahib-e-Asra; Aneela Gulzar; R. Ashiq; Najma Parveen	7 December 2019	South Asian Games	Kathmandu, Nepal	
4 × 400 m relay	3:44.81	Pakistan; Bushra Parveen; Sumaira Zahoor; Gulnaz Ara; Rozina Shafqat	26 August 2006	South Asian Games	Colombo, Sri Lanka	

=== Mixed ===
Event	Record	Athlete	Date	Meet	Place	Ref.
4 × 400 m relay	3:39.2 h	HEC Team; Amed Saeed; Sunaina Musawar; Fahad Khan; Rida Tariq	6 December 2023	Pakistani Championships	Attock, Pakistan	

=== Junior Men ===
Event	Record	Athlete	Date	Meet	Place	Ref.
100 m	10.92 NWI	Mueed Baloch	October 2018	Quaid Games	Islamabad, Pakistan	
100 m	10.79 NWI	Rayyan Hussain	3 February 2020	National Junior Championship	Lahore, Pakistan	
200 m	21.74 NWI	M. Shahbaz	4 September 2016	National Junior Championship	Islamabad, Pakistan	
200 m	21.72 NWI	Rayyan Hussain	3 February 2020	National Junior Championship	Lahore, Pakistan	
400 m	49.45	Muhammad Bilal Sadiq	3 June 2016	Asian Junior Championships	Ho Chi Minh City, Vietnam	
800 m	2:00.21	Aamir Sohail	29 October 2017	National Junior Championship	Islamabad, Pakistan	
1500 m	4:06.63	Sohail Aamir	4 September 2016	National Junior Championship	Islamabad, Pakistan	
5000 m	15:57.20	Muhammad Nasir	28 October 2017	National Junior Championship	Islamabad, Pakistan	
10,000 m	35:10.10	Nosherwan Ashiq	28 October 2017	National Junior Championship	Islamabad, Pakistan	
110 m hurdles	15.04	Muhammad Arslan	28 October 2017	National Junior Championship	Islamabad, Pakistan	
400 m hurdles	54.37	Usama Bashir	28 October 2017	National Junior Championship	Islamabad, Pakistan	
High jump	1.95 m	Shehroz Khan	28 October 2017	National Junior Championship	Islamabad, Pakistan	
Long jump	7.18 m	Mohammad Afzal	4 September 2016	National Junior Championship	Islamabad, Pakistan	
Triple jump	15.22 m	Mohammad Afzal	5 September 2016	National Junior Championship	Islamabad, Pakistan	
Shot put	15.40 m	Zohaib Khan	4 September 2016	National Junior Championship	Islamabad, Pakistan	
Discus throw	52.74 m	Shahnawaz	28 October 2017	National Junior Championship	Islamabad, Pakistan	
Hammer throw	57.87 m	Ihtasham Haider	28 October 2017	National Junior Championship	Islamabad, Pakistan	
Javelin throw	73.40 m	Arshad Nadeem	5 June 2016	Asian Junior Championships	Ho Chi Minh City, Vietnam	
4 × 100 m relay	42.44	Pakistan; Muhammad Shahbaz; Muhammad Laiq; Muhammad Bilal Sadiq; Muhammad Afzal	5 June 2016	Asian Junior Championships	Ho Chi Minh City, Vietnam	

== Indoor ==
=== Men ===
Event	Record	Athlete	Date	Meet	Place	Ref.
60 m	6.71	Shajar Abbas	11 February 2023	Asian Championships	Astana, Kazakhstan	
200 m	22.71	Afzal Baig	7 February 2004	Asian Championships	Tehran, Iran	
200 m	21.95 (Note: not ratified by AFP but recognised by World Athletics)	Umar Hameed	14 March 2010	BUCS Championships	Sheffield, United Kingdom	
400 m	49.40	Muhammad Irfan	9 February 2001		Rasht, Iran	
400 m	48.40 (Note: not ratified by AFP but recognised by World Athletics)	Nokar Hussain	18 September 2017	Asian Indoor and Martial Arts Games	Ashgabat, Turkmenistan	
800 m	1:52.08	Nadar Khan	8 March 1991	World Championships	Seville, Spain	
1500 m	4:02.36	Sohail Amir	6 February 2026	Asian Championships	Tianjin, China	
3000 m	8:24.53	Muhammad Akhtar	7 February 2026	Asian Championships	Tianjin, China	
3000 m	8:03.25	Talha Syed (Note: citizenship unclear, US by World Athletics source)	20 January 2024	Yale-Dartmouth-Columbia	New Haven, United States	
5000 m	13:44.97	Talha Syed (Note: citizenship unclear, US by World Athletics source)	7 December 2024	BU Sharon Colyear-Danville Season Opener	Boston, United States	
60 m hurdles	7.95	Abdul Rashid	14 November 2005	Asian Indoor Games	Pattaya, Thailand	
60 m hurdles	7.95	Sadjad Ahmad Muhammad	22 February 2007		Tehran, Iran	
High jump	2.14 m	Sharoz Khan	11 February 2023	Asian Championships	Astana, Kazakhstan	
Pole vault	4.70 m	Adnan Anjam	12 February 2009		Tehran, Iran	
Pole vault	4.70 m (Note: not ratified by AFP but recognised by World Athletics)	Adnan Anjam	14 February 2013		Tehran, Iran	
Long jump	7.25 m	Waseem Khan	8 February 2002		Rasht, Iran	
Triple jump	15.50 m	Waseem Khan	8 February 2004	Asian Championships	Tehran, Iran	
Shot put	16.52 m	Muhammad Ashraf Ali	15 November 2005	Asian Indoor Games	Pattaya, Thailand	
Heptathlon						
Heptathlon	60m / Long jump / Shot put / High jump / 60m H / Pole vault / 1000m					
5000 m walk						
4 × 400 m relay	3:11.40 (Note: not ratified by AFP but recognised by World Athletics)	Pakistan; Asad Iqbal; Mehboob Ali; Nishat Ali; Nokar Hussain	20 September 2017	Asian Indoor and Martial Arts Games	Ashgabat, Turkmenistan	

=== Women ===
Event	Record	Athlete	Date	Meet	Place	Ref.
60 m	7.78	Naseem Hameed	27 September 2005	Women's Islamic Games	Tehran, Iran	
200 m	26.0 h	Erum Khanum	12 October 2001		Rasht, Iran	
400 m	57.75	Bushra Parveen	13 November 2005	Asian Indoor Games	Pattaya, Thailand	
800 m	2:12.25	Gulnaz Ara	14 November 2005	Asian Indoor Games	Pattaya, Thailand	
1500 m	4:43.54	Sumaira Zahoor	25 September 2005	Women's Islamic Games	Tehran, Iran	
3000 m	11:45.13	Noreen Shagufta	27 September 2005	Women's Islamic Games	Tehran, Iran	
60 m hurdles	9.30	Shabana Khitak	12 October 2001		Rasht, Iran	
High jump	1.50 m	Rozina Shafqat	26 September 2005	Women's Islamic Games	Tehran, Iran	
Pole vault						
Long jump	5.97 m	Shabana Akhtar	16 December 1997		Rasht, Iran	
Triple jump	11.52 m (Note: not ratified by AFN but recognised by World Athletics)	Maria Maratab	19 September 2017	Asian Indoor and Martial Arts Games	Ashgabat, Turkmenistan	
Shot put	14.04 m	Zeenat Parveen	25 September 2005	Women's Islamic Games	Tehran, Iran	
Pentathlon	2659 pts	Rozina Shafqat	27 September 2005	Women's Islamic Games	Tehran, Iran	
Pentathlon	60m H / High jump / Shot put / Long jump / 800m					
3000 m walk						
4 × 400 m relay	3:51.88	Pakistan	27 September 2005	Women's Islamic Games	Tehran, Iran	

== See also ==
- National Athletics Championships
- Athletics in Pakistan
- Pakistan Sports Board
