= Liaquat Ali (athlete) =

Pakistani sprinter

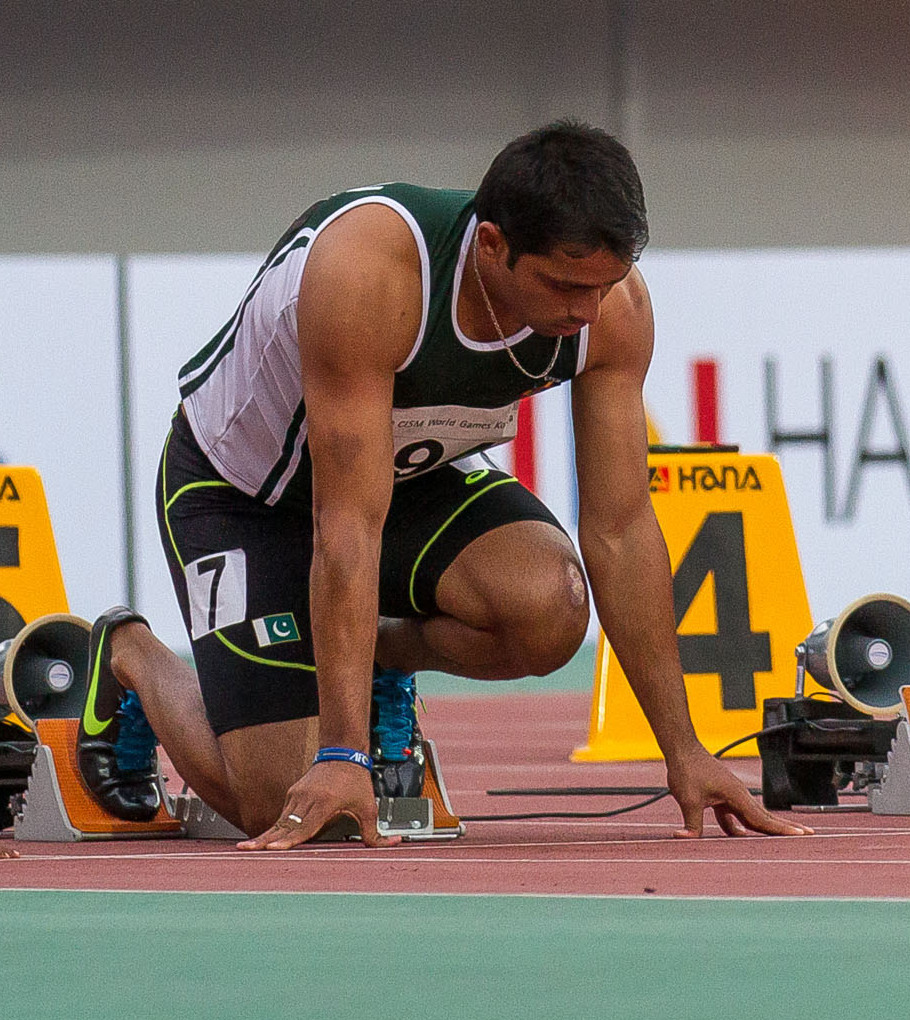
- Liaquat Ali at the 2015 Military World Games.

Personal information
- Nationality: Pakistani
- Born: 6 August 1983 (age 42) Okara, Pakistan

Sport
- Country: Pakistan
- Sport: Track and field
- Events: 100 metres, 200 metres
Medal record
Men's athletics
Representing Pakistan
South Asian Games
Bronze medal – third place	2010 Dhaka	100m
Bronze medal – third place	2010 Dhaka	200m
Silver medal – second place	2016 Guwahati	4×100m
Bronze medal – third place	2016 Guwahati	200m
South Asian Championships
Silver medal – second place	2008 Kochi	4×100m

Liaquat Ali (born 6 August 1983, Okara) is a Pakistani sprinter. He competed in the men's 100m at the 2012 London Olympics. He has represented Pakistan at multiple World Championships including Berlin 2009, Moscow 2013, and Beijing 2015. He finished 7th in the men's 200m at the 2013 Asian Athletics Championships in Pune.

== Background ==
Ali comes from Renala Khurd in Punjab. He is currently a professional athlete/coach in the sports department of Pakistan Army.

== Career ==
=== National ===
Ali represents Pakistan Army in National competitions. Ali has consecutively played the Pakistan National games from 2006 to 2020 and currently holds the highest record of obtaining the most gold medals which is 59, with only one silver and one bronze in the events of 100m, 200m and 400m men's relay. He is currently also a member of the Athletics Federation of Pakistan which is the governing body of athletics in Pakistan.

=== International ===
Ali was awarded a wildcard for the 2012 Summer Olympics in London, UK where he represented Pakistan by competing in the 100m. He eventually came fourth in the men's 100-meter preliminary race with a time of 10.90 seconds. He missed third position by just 0.01 seconds and thus did not qualify for the next round. He won two bronze medals for Pakistan at the 2010 South Asian Games. Ali has participated in 17 international competitions and has secured a medal in each. He has also represented Pakistan at the 2009, 2013 and 2015 World Athletics Championships. Ali has completed the IAAF Level 1 coach course and is now a certified IAAF coach.

=== Personal best ===
- 100 metres – 10:10, new national record in 2011

== See also ==
- List of Pakistani records in athletics
- Athletics in Pakistan
- Pakistan at the Olympics
- Afzal Baig, contemporary competitor in the same events
