= Sadaf Siddiqui =

Pakistani sprinter

Personal information
- Born: 27 August 1985 (age 40) Lahore, Pakistan

Sport
- Country: Pakistan
- Sport: Track and field
- Event: 100 metres
Medal record
Women's athletics
Representing Pakistan
South Asian Games
Silver medal – second place	2006 Colombo	100 m
Silver medal – second place	2006 Colombo	4 × 100 m relay
Bronze medal – third place	2010 Dhaka	4 × 100 m relay
South Asian Championships
Bronze medal – third place	2008 Kochi	4×100m

Sadaf Siddiqui (born August 27, 1985) is a Pakistani sprinter. Siddiqui represented Pakistan at the 2008 Summer Olympics in Beijing where she competed in the Women's 100 metres event.

== Career ==
Siddiqui participated in the sprint events: 100 metres and 200 metres.

=== International ===
In 2006, at the 10th South Asian Games held in Colombo, Sri Lanka, Sadaf won a silver medal in the women's 100m race. She was also part of the silver winning women's relay team in the games along with Saira Fazal, Naseem Hameed and Nadia Nazir.

In 2008, she represented Pakistan at the Summer Olympics in Beijing. Siddiqui was one of the two female competitors in Pakistan's 37-member contingent for the Olympic games, the other being Kiran Khan in swimming category. Siddiqui competed in the 100 metres sprint and placed seventh in her heat without advancing to the second round. She ran the distance in a time of 12.41 seconds at the Bird's Nest national stadium.

In 2010, at the 11th South Asian Games in Dhaka, Sadaf along with athletes Nadia Nazir, Naseem Hameed and Javeria Hassan was part of the women relay team that won bronze medal.

Local Competitions
Discipline	Performance	Venue	Score	Date
200 m	23.6 s	Lahore(PAK)	1051	14 March 2009
100 m	11.39 s	Lahore(PAK)	964	13 March 2009
100 m	11.81 s	Lahore(PAK)	1030	22 April 2008
200 m	24.36 s	Lahore(PAK)	1001	21 April 2008
200 m	23.6 s	Lahore(PAK)	1051	14 March 2008

== Drug Ban ==
In 2010, Sadaf Siddiqui, along with many other top athletes failed the doping tests conducted during national trials, prior to the Commonwealth Games conducted in New Delhi. Siddiqui was banned by the Athletics Federation of Pakistan (AFP) for 2 years for the use of steroids.

Siddiqui claimed that the doping test came positive due to a medicine she had taken to combat her fever. She said if she had known earlier about it, she would not have taken the medicine. Siddiqui said that players are not aware of the kind of medicines to not be taken prior to doping test and there should be an awareness campaign to educate players competing at international level. Siddiqui took up to the government and the media to help her in her case to lift the ban. She appealed to the Minister Sports Khyber Pakhtunkhwa Syed Aqil Shah at Olympic Secretariat to remove her ban. According to Siddiqui, she had appealed before the appellate tribunal within the next 14 days of the ban but it was rejected. The athlete said that after two years, her career would finish

== Marriage ==
Sadaf Siddiqui married journalist and former General Secretary of Rawalpindi Islamabad Sports Journalist Association (RISJA), Afzal Javed in 2011.

The wedding was attended by politicians and many high-end personalities including Interior Minister Rehman Malik, House in the Senate leader Syed Nayar Hussain Bukhari, PM's advisor on law and justice Advocate Farooq Awan, Babar Awan and other notable people.

== See also ==
- List of Pakistani records in athletics
- Athletics in Pakistan
- Pakistan at the Olympics
