= Mohammad Mansha =

Pakistani sprinter (born 1962)

Mohammad Masha
Personal information
- Native name: محمد منشا
- Born: June 9, 1962 (age 64)
- Years active: 1984–1989
- Height: 168 cm (5 ft 6 in)
- Weight: 128 lb (58 kg)

Sport
- Country: Pakistan
- Sport: Track and field
- Event: Sprints
Medal record
Men's athletics
Representing Pakistan
Event	1st	2nd	3rd
South Asian Games	0	2	2
National Athletics Championships	2	1	0
Total	2	3	2
Event	1st	2nd	3rd
100 m	0	2	0
200 m	2	1	0
4×100 m relay			2
Total	2	3	2
South Asian Games
Silver medal – second place	1985 Dhaka	100 m
Silver medal – second place	1985 Dhaka	200 m
Bronze medal – third place	1985 Dhaka	4×100 m relay
Bronze medal – third place	1987 Calcutta	4×100 m relay
National Athletics Championships
Gold medal – first place	1985 Islamabad	200 m
Gold medal – first place	1986 Quetta	200 m
Silver medal – second place	1986 Quetta	100 m

Mohammad Mansha (born June 9, 1962) is a Pakistani former sprinter who represented Pakistan at the 1984 Summer Olympics in Los Angeles, competing in both the 100 metres and 200 metres events.

== Career ==
Mansha had no significant achievements either at the national or international level before the Los Angeles Olympiad. There he finished seventh and last in the 100 metres event with a time of 10.87 seconds. The man who led Mansha's particular heat was Jamaica's Ray Stewart who did so in 10.24 seconds. Stewart ran in sixth in the final in 10.29 seconds.

Mansha's time in the 200 metres race was 22.04 seconds. He ended sixth out of eight runners in his heat. Italy's Carlo Simionato with a time of 21.06 was first. Simionato didn't make the event's final.

Mansha finally made a mark at the Pakistan domestic level at Islamabad in 1985, when he took the 200 metres gold in the National Athletics Championship. He repeated this feat at Quetta in 1986 when he also finished second in the 100 metres race. Mansha had an identical time of 21.7 seconds in his two 200 metres wins.

At the South Asian Games in Dhaka, Bangladesh, in 1985, Mansha took silver medals in both the 100 metres (10.8sec) and 200 metres (21.58sec) events. Mohammed Shah Alam of Bangladesh won the gold medal in 100 metres (also with a time of 10.8) while India's Neelapu Rami Reddy was first in the 200 metres with a time of 21.1 seconds.

Mansha's third medal at the 1985 South Asian Games was a bronze in the 4x100 metres relay, the Pakistan quartet finishing in a time of 42.1 seconds.

Mansha had taken part in the first SAG Games in Kathmandu in 1984 without winning any medals. He also toured China with a Pakistan squad and Alexandria (for the 31st CISM Military Games) later the same year, without achieving anything of note.

At the Asian Games in Seoul in 1986, Mansha ran his 200 metres first round heat 2 in 22.21 seconds and was eliminated. He finished fourth in the 200 metres (21.93sec) at the 1987 South Asian Games in Calcutta and after winning nothing at the 1989 South Asian Games in Islamabad, he faded away from the athletics scene.
