= Allah Ditta (hurdler) =

Pakistani hurdler (born 1977)

Personal information
- Full name: Allah Ditta
- Nationality: Pakistan
- Born: 7 February 1977 (age 49) Panjeri, Azad Kashmir, Pakistan
- Height: 1.75 m (5 ft 9 in)
- Weight: 68 kg (150 lb)

Sport
- Country: Pakistan
- Sport: Athletics
- Event: Hurdles
Medal record
Men's athletics
Representing Pakistan
South Asian Games
| Gold medal – first place | 2006 Colombo | 400 m hurdles |
| Gold medal – first place | 2004 Islamabad | 400 m hurdles |
| Gold medal – first place | 1999 Kathmandu | 400 m hurdles |

Allah Ditta (born 7 February 1977) is a former Pakistani hurdler.

Ditta first competed internationally at the 2002 Commonwealth Games in Manchester, England. Representing Pakistan, he finished 5th in his heat of the 400 m hurdles event in a season best time of 51.03 seconds. Two months later at the 2002 Asian Games in Busan, South Korea, Ditta finished seventh in the final of the 400 m hurdles in 51.22 seconds. Four years later at the 2006 South Asian Games in Colombo, Sri Lanka, Ditta won gold in the 400 m hurdles in 51 seconds flat. Four months later at the 2006 Asian Games in Doha, Qatar, Ditta finished fifth in his heat of the 400 m hurdles and failed to advance to the final.

== See also ==
- List of Pakistani records in athletics
- Athletics in Pakistan
