= 1992 Asian Junior Athletics Championships =

4th Asian Junior Championships
- Dates: 2 – 5 December
- Host city: New Delhi, India
- Level: Junior (under-20)
- Events: 40

The 1992 Asian Junior Athletics Championships was the fourth edition of the international athletics competition for Asian under-20 athletes, organised by the Asian Athletics Association. It took place from 2–5 December in New Delhi, India. A total of 40 events were contested, 22 for male athletes and 18 for female athletes.

== Medal summary ==
=== Men ===
Event	Gold		Silver		Bronze	
100 metres	Lin Wei (CHN)	10.43	Sultan Mohamed Al-Sheib (QAT)	10.73	Ku Wai Ming (HKG)	10.82
200 metres	Lin Wei (CHN)	21.24	Keita Hiraga (JPN)	21.64	Tatsuya Yoshida (JPN)	21.64
400 metres	Hiroyuki Hayashi (JPN)	47.06	Kenji Tabata (JPN)	47.68	P. I. Sebastian (IND)	47.93
800 metres	Lee Jin-il (KOR)	1:50.15	Zafar Iqbal (PAK)	1:50.90	Kim Soon-hyung (KOR)	1:51.32
1500 metres	Lee Jin-il (KOR)	3:52.42	Zafar Iqbal (PAK)	3:52.59	Kim Soon-hyung (KOR)	3:52.75
5000 metres	Gulab Chand (IND)	14:32.6	Ko Jung-Won (KOR)	14:33.6	Sun Ripeng (CHN)	14:34.2
10,000 metres	Ko Jung-Won (KOR)	30:37.00	Abdi Farah (QAT)	30:50.19	Anil Kumar Gupta (IND)	31:33.92
110 metres hurdles	Lin Rongsheng (CHN)	14.42	Satoshi Murohoroshi (JPN)	14.75	Hideaki Kawamura (JPN)	14.78
400 metres hurdles	Ali Ismail Doka (QAT)	51.37	Mohamed Al-Bishi (KSA)	51.57	Hideaki Kawamura (JPN)	52.08
3000 metres steeplechase	Takeshi Yamamoto (JPN)	8:56.97	Tsugio Machida (JPN)	9:01.32	Sun Ripeng (CHN)	9:01.38
4×100 m relay	Japan (JPN)	40.69	India (IND)	41.02	Thailand (THA)	41.05
4×400 m relay	Japan (JPN)	3:11.29	Pakistan (PAK)	3:13.14	India (IND)	3:13.92
10,000 metres walk	Tikka Jagdev Singh (IND)	47:10.6	Pawan Kumar (IND)	48:50.2	Daljit Singh (IND)	49:35.6
High jump	Bi Hongyong (CHN)	2.21 m CR	Kim Tae-Hyung (KOR)	2.15 m	Ching Cheng-Chin (TPE)	2.06 m
Pole vault	Masaki Miyake (JPN)	5.10 m CR	Chen Yung-Chih (TPE)	4.70 m	Kenji Hosomayo (JPN)	4.70 m
Long jump	Huang Baoting (CHN)	7.59 m	Daisuke Watanabe (JPN)	7.50 m	Marandi Birdhan Sadasivan (IND)	7.29 m
Triple jump	Zeng Lizhi (CHN)	16.44 m	Kenichi Sumita (JPN)	16.04 m	Cha Gyong-Son (PRK)	15.67 m
Shot put	Manjit Singh (IND)	16.93 m	Jiang Guangcheng (CHN)	16.54 m	Jogesh Singh Kumar (IND)	16.39 m
Discus throw	Bahadur Singh (IND)	52.20 m	Liu Lihong (CHN)	51.90 m	Rajiv Singh Kumar (IND)	49.12 m
Hammer throw	Nasser Al-Jarallah (KUW)	60.20 m	Jaswinder Singh (IND)	58.80 m	Aqarab Abbas (PAK)	58.10 m
Javelin throw	Satbir Singh Saran (IND)	68.98 m	Shang Baolong (CHN)	67.02 m	Vinod Kumar (IND)	66.52 m
Decathlon	Abdul Marzouk Al-Shahrani (KSA)	6545 pts	Hadi Al-Somaily (KSA)	6249 pts	Chuan Chi-Cheng (TPE)	6020 pts

=== Women ===
Event	Gold		Silver		Bronze	
100 metres	Ou Yanlan (CHN)	11.88 CR	Chen Shu-Chen (TPE)	11.94	Tomomi Kaneko (JPN)	12.17
200 metres	Rachita Panda (IND)	24.42	Ou Yanlan (CHN)	24.50	Renu Mehta (IND)	24.70
400 metres	Hsu Pei-Chin (TPE)	54.08	K. M. Beenamol (IND)	55.47	Rajwa Jaspreet (IND)	55.92
800 metres	K. M. Beenamol (IND)	2:07.73	K.S. Bijimol (IND)	2:08.48	Kim Hae-Yeong (KOR)	2:08.49
1500 metres	Li Haiyan (CHN)	4:26.83	Madoka Suzuki (JPN)	4:27.36	Zeng Yuying (CHN)	4:29.28
3000 metres	Madoka Suzuki (JPN)	9:31.78	Parbati Mohanta (IND)	9:32.13	Chiemi Takahashi (JPN)	9:36.72
10,000 metres	Neelam Rai (IND)	35:40.84	Parbati Mohanta (IND)	35:49.05	Akwinder Kaur (IND)	37:39.38
100 metres hurdles	Ryoko Jojima (JPN)	13.99	Hsu Hsiu-Ying (TPE)	13.99	Zhou Jing (CHN)	14.12
400 metres hurdles	Hsu Pei-Chin (TPE)	58.46	Cheng Meng-Chun (TPE)	61.90	Megumi Tsuchiya (JPN)	61.90
4×100 m relay	India (IND)	46.02 CR	Japan (JPN)	46.40	Chinese Taipei (TPE)	46.54
4×400 m relay	India (IND)	3:41.27 CR	Chinese Taipei (TPE)	3:41.72	Thailand (THA)	3:44.08
5000 metres walk	Miwako Tsukada (JPN)	24:13.23	Jo Sun-Boon (KOR)	25:16.19	Satinder Kaur (IND)	26:49.50
High jump	Lin Su-Chi (TPE)	1.81 m	Yoko Ota (JPN)	1.78 m	Miki Imai (JPN)	1.75 m
Long jump	Zhang Hongling (CHN)	6.38 m CR	Hitomi Takamatsu (JPN)	6.38 m	Lekha Thomas (IND)	5.98 m
Shot put	Wang Hui (CHN)	15.28 m	Lee Myeong-Seon (KOR)	14.49 m	Sunisa Yooyao (THA)	14.31 m
Discus throw	Hu Honglian (CHN)	51.70 m	Swaranjeet Kaur (IND)	43.28 m	Sunisa Yooyao (THA)	42.62 m
Javelin throw	Lee Yeong-Seon (KOR)	54.30 m	Li Pingli (CHN)	49.76 m	Sushma Behera (IND)	46.52 m
Heptathlon	Han Sang-Won (KOR)	5223 pts	Yukiko Ueno (JPN)	5135 pts	Lin Chao-Hsiu (TPE)	5110 pts

== 1992 Medal Table ==
Rank	Nation	Gold	Silver	Bronze	Total
1	China (CHN)	11	5	4	20
2	India (IND)	10	8	14	32
3	Japan (JPN)	8	11	8	27
4	South Korea (KOR)	5	4	3	12
5	Chinese Taipei (TPE)	3	5	4	12
6	Qatar (QAT)	1	2	0	3
6	Saudi Arabia (KSA)	1	2	0	3
8	Kuwait (KUW)	1	0	0	1
9	Pakistan (PAK)	0	3	1	4
10	Thailand (THA)	0	0	4	4
11	Hong Kong (HKG)	0	0	1	1
11	North Korea (PRK)	0	0	1	1
Totals (12 entries)		40	40	40	120
