= Tagawa (surname) =

Tagawa (written: 田川 or 田河 lit. "ricefield river") is a Japanese surname. Notable people with the surname include:

- Cary-Hiroyuki Tagawa (1950–2025), Japanese-American actor and film producer
- Charlie Tagawa (1935–2017), Japanese-American musician
- Félix Tagawa (born 1976), Tahitian footballer
- Tagawa Matsu (田川 松; 1601–1647), mother of Koxinga, conqueror of Taiwan
- Seiichi Tagawa (田川 誠一; 1918–2009), Japanese politician
- Shigeru Tagawa (born 1975), Japanese long jumper
- Suihō Tagawa (田河 水泡; 1899–1989), Japanese manga artist
