= Daisuke Watanabe (disambiguation) =

Daisuke Watanabe (渡辺 大祐, born 1974) is a Japanese video game writer.

Daisuke Watanabe may also refer to:

- Daisuke Watanabe (actor) (渡辺 大輔, born 1982), Japanese actor
- Daisuke Watanabe (long jumper) (渡辺 大輔, born 1975), Japanese long jumper
- Daisuke Watanabe (figure skater), Japanese figure skater
