= Muhammad Siddique =

Pakistani middle-distance runner (born 1948)

Personal information
- Nationality: Pakistani
- Born: 30 October 1948 (age 77)

Sport
- Sport: Middle-distance running
- Event: 800 metres
Medal record
Men's athletics
Representing Pakistan
Asian Games
| Bronze medal – third place | 1974 Tehran | 800 m |

Muhammad Siddique (born 30 October 1948) is a Pakistani middle-distance runner. He competed in the men's 800 metres at the 1972 Summer Olympics and the 1500 metres at the 1976 Summer Olympics.

In both 1969 and 1970, Siddique won bronze medals in both the 800 m and 1500 m at the Pakistani Athletics Championships, which he improved to 2nd in the 800 m and 3rd in the 1500 m in 1971. The following year he would again finish runner-up in the 800 m. He also ran 1:52.6 to place 7th in his heat at the 1972 Olympic 800 m.

After winning bronze at the 1973 national championships, he would improve his Olympic time by over 4 seconds in July 1974, running 1:48.10 to place 6th at a meeting in Hannover, Germany. As of 2024, this time is still the Pakistani national record. Two months later, Siddique won his first international medal at the 1974 Asian Games, earning bronze in the 800 m. He also ran on the Pakistani 4 × 400 metres relay team that finished 5th in their heat.

At the 1976 Olympics, Siddique placed 9th in his 1500 m heat in 3:45.59.

== See also ==
- List of Pakistani records in athletics
- Athletics in Pakistan
