= Aqarab Abbas =

Pakistani hammer thrower (born 1973)

Personal information
- Nationality: Pakistani
- Born: 31 December 1973 (age 52) Pakistan
- Height: 190 cm (6 ft 3 in)
- Weight: 88 kg (194 lb)

Sport
- Country: Pakistan
- Sport: Hammer throw
Medal record
Men's athletics
Representing Pakistan
Asian Games
Bronze medal – third place	1994 Hiroshima	Hammer throw
South Asian Games
Gold medal – first place	1995 Madras	Hammer throw
Silver medal – second place	1993 Dhaka	Hammer throw
Asian U20 Championships
Bronze medal – third place	1992 New Delhi	Hammer throw

Aqarab Abbas is a Pakistani Olympic hammer thrower. He represented his country at the 1996 Summer Olympics. His best toss in those Olympics was a 65.60 throw, while his personal best, set in 1995, was 68.20. He won the bronze medal in the hammer throw event at the 1994 Asian Games with a throw of 66.70.

== See also ==
- List of Pakistani records in athletics
- Athletics in Pakistan
- Pakistan at the Olympics
