= Twinkle Sohail =

Pakistani weightlifter (born 1998)

Personal information
- Nationality: Pakistani
- Born: 1998 (age 27–28) Lahore, Punjab, Pakistan

Sport
- Sport: Powerlifting
- Club: Pakistan Railways
- Coached by: Rashid Malik; Muhammad Zahid
Medal record
Women's Powerlifting
Representing Pakistan
Asian Bench Press Championship
Gold medal – first place	2015 Muscat	47kg (Junior)
International Oceania Pacific Powerlifting Championship
Gold medal – first place	2017 Singapore	Squat (47kg)
Gold medal – first place	2017 Singapore	Bench press (47kg)
Gold medal – first place	2017 Singapore	Deadlift (47kg)
Gold medal – first place	2017 Singapore	Overall (47kg)
Asian Pacific African Combined Powerlifting Championship
Gold medal – first place	2024 South Africa	Squat (84kg)
Gold medal – first place	2024 South Africa	Bench press (84kg)
Gold medal – first place	2024 South Africa	Deadlift (84kg)
Gold medal – first place	2024 South Africa	Overall (84kg)
Commonwealth Powerlifting Championship
Silver medal – second place	2024 Sun City	84 kg classic bench press

Twinkle Sohail (born 1998) is a Pakistani powerlifter from Lahore. In 2015, she became the first Pakistani woman to win an international gold medal in powerlifting, claiming gold in the 47 kg Junior category at the Asian Bench Press Championship in Muscat, Oman, on her international debut. She is a multiple national champion and has represented Pakistan in powerlifting competitions across Asia, Oceania, and the Commonwealth.

== Personal life ==
Twinkle was born and raised in Lahore, Pakistan, into a family from Pakistan's Christian community. She holds a degree in BS Sports Sciences from the University of Lahore.

== Career ==
Twinkle began her sporting career as a cyclist before coach Rashid Malik identified her potential in powerlifting. She trains at the Punjab University Women's Weightlifting Centre in Lahore under coaches Rashid Malik and Muhammad Zahid, and represents Pakistan Railways in national competitions.

=== National ===
In November 2019, she won gold in the 76 kg category at the 33rd National Games of Pakistan in Peshawar.

=== International ===
In 2015, aged 17, Twinkle competed at the Asian Bench Press Championship in Muscat, Oman. She was the first Pakistani woman to represent her country at an international powerlifting event=, and won gold in the 47 kg Junior (Under-21) category — making her simultaneously the first Pakistani woman to win an international powerlifting gold medal.

In 2017, at the International Oceania Pacific Powerlifting Championship in Singapore, she won four gold medals — in the squat, bench press, deadlift, and overall (47 kg).

In December 2019, she represented Pakistan at the 2019 South Asian Games in Kathmandu, Nepal.

In July 2024, at the Asian Pacific African Combined Powerlifting Championship in South Africa, she competed in the 84 kg category and won four gold medals — in the squat, bench press, deadlift, and overall.

In October 2024, she made her debut at the Commonwealth Powerlifting Championship in Sun City, South Africa, winning a silver medal in the 84 kg classic bench press category.

== See also ==
- Sybil Sohail
- List of Pakistani sportswomen
