= PP-112 Faisalabad-XV =

Constituency of the Punjabi Provincial Legislature, Pakistan

- Constituency for the Provincial Assembly of Punjab
- Region: Faisalabad city area in Faisalabad District

Current constituency
- Created from: PP-66 Faisalabad-XVI (2002-2018); PP-111 Faisalabad-XV (2018-2023)

PP-112 Faisalabad-XV (پی پی-112، فیصل آباد-15) is a constituency of Provincial Assembly of Punjab.

== General elections 2024 ==
Provincial election 2024: PP-112 Faisalabad-XV
Party	Candidate	Votes	%	±%
Independent	Asad Mehmood (Note: Filed nomination papers as PTI candidate but ECP allowed him to run as an Independent)	75,565	54.42	
PML(N)	Asrar Ahmad Khan	47,866	34.47	
TLP	Waheed Ahmad	4,551	3.28	
PPP	Intazar Ahmad	2,003	1.44	
Others	Others (thirty three candidates)	8,871	6.39	
Turnout		141,378	47.90	
Total valid votes		138,856	98.22	
Rejected ballots		2,522	1.78	
Majority		27,699	19.95	
Registered electors		295,128		
hold				

== General elections 2018 ==
Provincial election 2018: PP-111 Faisalabad-XV
Party	Candidate	Votes	%	±%
PTI	Shakeel Shahid	57,539	40.52	
PML(N)	Asrar Ahmad Khan	51,654	36.38	
Independent	Muhammad Islam	12,778	9.00	
Independent	Najam Hussain	9,171	6.46	
TLP	Rana Muhammad Ahsan Sikander Khan	4,082	2.88	
AAT	Abdul Wahid	3,207	2.26	
PPP	Umer Draz Ahmed Azad	1,614	1.14	
Others	Others (ten candidates)	1,947	1.36	
Turnout		144,320	57.08	
Total valid votes		141,992	98.39	
Rejected ballots		2,328	1.61	
Majority		5,885	4.14	
Registered electors		252,844		

== General elections 2013 ==
Provincial election 2013: PP-66 Faisalabad-XVI
Party	Candidate	Votes	%	±%
PML(N)	Haji Khalid Saeed	53,906	54.82	
PTI	Najam Hussain	29,670	30.18	
PPP	Shakeel Shahid	5,750	5.85	
Independent	Qamar Uz Zaman Awan	5,646	5.74	
MWM	Dr. Syed Iftikhar Hussain Naqvi	1,049	1.07	
Others	Others (twenty three candidates)	2,305	2.34	
Turnout		99,639	59.82	
Total valid votes		98,326	98.68	
Rejected ballots		1,313	1.32	
Majority		24,236	24.64	
Registered electors		166,556		

== General elections 2008 ==
Contesting candidates	party affiliation	votes polled

== See also ==
- PP-111 Faisalabad-XIV
- PP-113 Faisalabad-XVI
