= Nawaz Haq =

Pakistani hurdler (born 1981)

Nawaz Haq نواز حق
Personal information
- Nationality: Pakistani
- Born: 10 September 1981 (age 44) Peshawar, Khyber Pakhtunkhwa, Pakistan

Sport
- Country: Pakistan
- Sport: Track and field
- Event: 400 metre hurdles
Medal record
Men's athletics
Representing Pakistan
Athletics at the 2010 South Asian Games
| Silver medal – second place | 2010 Dhaka | 400 metre hurdles |

Nawaz Haq (Urdu: نواز حق; born 10 September 1981) Is a Pakistani track and field athlete. He won a silver medal in the 400 metre hurdles event of the 11th South Asian Federation (SAF) Games in Dhaka in February 2010. He represented his country in that event at the 2007 World Championships in Athletics.
