= Muhammad Younis =

Pakistani middle-distance runner (1948–2024)

Personal information
- Nationality: Pakistani
- Born: 4 November 1948
- Died: 29 October 2024 (aged 75)

Sport
- Country: Pakistan
- Sport: Athletics
- Event: Middle-distance running
Medal record
Men's athletics
Representing Pakistan
Asian Games
Gold medal – first place	1974 Tehran	1500m
Silver medal – second place	1978 Bangkok	1500m
Silver medal – second place	1970 Bangkok	1500m
Asian Championships
Gold medal – first place	1973 Marikina	800m
Silver medal – second place	1973 Marikina	1500m

Muhammad Younis
- Awards: Pride of Performance award by the President of Pakistan in 1990

Muhammad Younis or Malik Muhammad Younis (4 November 1948 – 29 October 2024) was a Pakistani middle distance runner who competed in the 1972 Summer Olympics and the 1976 Summer Olympics.

He still holds the national records in 1500 metres, 2000 metres, 3000 metres and 5000 metres with times of 3:41.4, 5:09.7, 8:05.65 and 14:08.4 respectively, all set in West Germany during the 1970s.

== Career ==
Muhammad Younis was born on 4 November 1948. Younis represented Pakistan in the 800 metres and 1500 metres events across multiple international competitions throughout the 1970s. Younis clinched 56 gold medals domestically and 27 golds internationally. His most notable victories include a gold medal at the 1974 Asian Games in Tehran and a double podium finish at the 1973 Asian Athletics Championships in Marikina, where he won gold and silver. His national record in the 1500m, set in 1970 in Cologne, Germany, with a time of 3:41.4, remains unbroken to this day. He also set national records in the 3000m (8:05.65) and 5000m (14:08.4) events in 1971 and 1977, respectively, during competitions in Germany. His participation in the 1976 Montreal Olympics became a turning point after an alleged administrative error led to his entry in the 800m event instead of his favoured 1500m. Despite the setback, Younis set a new national record in the 800m at the Games.

== Career setback due to accident ==
In 1979, Younis’s competitive career was abruptly cut short due to a serious motorcycle accident. He was accompanied by his friend, Muhammad Aslam (also an athlete in the Army), at the time of the incident, which left him unable to continue competing at the elite level. Yet, he remained deeply involved in athletics and served as an inspiration to young athletes across Pakistan.

== Awards and recognition ==
Ribbon	Decoration	Country	Year
	Pride of Performance	Pakistan	1990

His contributions were officially recognised in 1990 when he was awarded the Pride of Performance award, one of Pakistan’s highest honours for contributions to the arts, sciences, and sports by the President of Pakistan.

== Death ==
Muhammad Younis died due to a heart attack on 29 October 2024 at age 75. His funeral prayers were held at his hometown in Attock District, Punjab, Pakistan.

== See also ==
- Athletics in Pakistan
- List of Pakistani records in athletics
