= 1994 World Junior Championships in Athletics – Men's long jump =

The men's long jump event at the 1994 World Junior Championships in Athletics was held in Lisbon, Portugal, at Estádio Universitário de Lisboa on 20 and 21 July.

== Medalists ==
Gold	Gregor Cankar; Slovenia
Silver	Bogdan Țăruș; Romania
Bronze	Shigeru Tagawa; Japan

== Results ==
=== Final ===
21 July

Rank	Name	Nationality	Attempts						Result	Notes
Rank	Name	Nationality	1	2	3	4	5	6	Result	Notes
1st place, gold medalist(s)	Gregor Cankar	Slovenia	x	7.87 (w: +1.6 m/s)	x	x	x	8.04 w (w: +3.1 m/s)	8.04 w (w: +3.1 m/s)	
2nd place, silver medalist(s)	Bogdan Țăruș	Romania	7.81 (w: +1.9 m/s)	7.88 (w: +1.8 m/s)	7.65 (w: +1.4 m/s)	8.01 (w: +2.0 m/s)	6.31 w (w: +2.1 m/s)	7.68 w (w: +2.4 m/s)	8.01 (w: +2.0 m/s)	
3rd place, bronze medalist(s)	Shigeru Tagawa	Japan	7.62 w (w: +2.2 m/s)	7.55 (w: +1.1 m/s)	7.66 (w: +2.0 m/s)	7.47 (w: +0.9 m/s)	7.82 (w: +0.9 m/s)	7.85 w (w: +2.2 m/s)	7.85 w (w: +2.2 m/s)	
4	Andrew Channer	Canada	7.79 w (w: +2.3 m/s)	7.55 (w: +1.1 m/s)	x	7.66 (w: +0.9 m/s)	7.59 (w: +1.8 m/s)	x	7.79 w (w: +2.3 m/s)	
5	Darius Pemberton	United States	7.72 (w: +0.7 m/s)	7.71 (w: +1.2 m/s)	7.77 w (w: +2.9 m/s)	7.54 w (w: +2.8 m/s)	7.55 (w: +1.8 m/s)	x	7.77 w (w: +2.9 m/s)	
6	Olivier Borderan	France	x	7.66 (w: +1.7 m/s)	x	7.74 (w: +1.3 m/s)	7.67 (w: +0.8 m/s)	x	7.74 (w: +1.3 m/s)	
7	Andrej Benda	Slovakia	7.61 w (w: +2.2 m/s)	7.72 w (w: +2.3 m/s)	7.56 (w: +1.9 m/s)	7.15 (w: +1.1 m/s)	5.22 (w: +1.8 m/s)	7.66 w (w: +2.3 m/s)	7.72 w (w: +2.3 m/s)	
8	Carlos Calado	Portugal	7.51 w (w: +2.2 m/s)	x	7.44 w (w: +2.2 m/s)	7.37 w (w: +2.3 m/s)	7.56 w (w: +3.0 m/s)	7.39 (w: +2.0 m/s)	7.56 w (w: +3.0 m/s)	
9	Dmitriy Myshka	Ukraine	7.46 (w: +1.7 m/s)	7.27 (w: +1.6 m/s)	x				7.46 (w: +1.7 m/s)	
10	Andrey Sazykin	Russia	5.30 w (w: +2.4 m/s)	6.86 (w: +2.0 m/s)	7.44 (w: +0.2 m/s)				7.44 (w: +0.2 m/s)	
11	Lenard Cobb	United States	x	x	7.40 (w: +1.6 m/s)				7.40 (w: +1.6 m/s)	
12	Randy Sedoc	Netherlands	x	x	7.08 (w: +1.4 m/s)				7.08 (w: +1.4 m/s)	

=== Qualifications ===
20 Jul

==== Group A ====
Rank	Name	Nationality	Attempts			Result	Notes
Rank	Name	Nationality	1	2	3	Result	Notes
1	Darius Pemberton	United States	7.75 (w: +1.2 m/s)	-	-	7.75 (w: +1.2 m/s)	Q
2	Carlos Calado	Portugal	7.43 (w: +1.4 m/s)	7.51 (w: +1.1 m/s)	7.68 w (w: +2.3 m/s)	7.68 w (w: +2.3 m/s)	Q
3	Shigeru Tagawa	Japan	7.55 (w: -0.4 m/s)	x	7.51 (w: +1.2 m/s)	7.55 (w: -0.4 m/s)	q
4	Olivier Borderan	France	x	x	7.48 (w: +1.7 m/s)	7.48 (w: +1.7 m/s)	q
5	Randy Sedoc	Netherlands	7.39 w (w: +3.0 m/s)	x	7.16 (w: +0.2 m/s)	7.39 w (w: +3.0 m/s)	q
6	Yeóryios Tongas	Greece	7.07 (w: +0.5 m/s)	7.19 w (w: +2.2 m/s)	7.35 (w: +1.5 m/s)	7.35 (w: +1.5 m/s)	
7	Felix Coetzee	South Africa	7.35 w (w: +2.6 m/s)	6.86 (w: +1.0 m/s)	6.99 (w: +1.9 m/s)	7.35 w (w: +2.6 m/s)	
8	Chen Jing	China	7.28 w (w: +2.4 m/s)	7.28 (w: +0.7 m/s)	7.27 (w: -0.3 m/s)	7.28 w (w: +2.4 m/s)	
9	Dejan Vojnović	Croatia	7.21 (w: +1.8 m/s)	x	7.26 (w: +1.0 m/s)	7.26 (w: +1.0 m/s)	
10	Shane Hair	Australia	7.15 (w: +2.0 m/s)	7.23 (w: +0.7 m/s)	7.07 w (w: +2.2 m/s)	7.23 (w: +0.7 m/s)	
11	Áron Szmuda	Slovakia	7.22 (w: +0.9 m/s)	x	7.15 (w: +1.0 m/s)	7.22 (w: +0.9 m/s)	
12	Kiril Sosunov	Russia	6.87 (w: +1.2 m/s)	7.12 (w: +1.1 m/s)	x	7.12 (w: +1.1 m/s)	
13	Téko Folligan	Togo	7.02 (w: +1.6 m/s)	7.07 w (w: +3.2 m/s)	6.98 (w: +0.5 m/s)	7.07 w (w: +3.2 m/s)	
14	Krzysztof Łuczak	Poland	6.79 (w: +0.7 m/s)	6.71 (w: -0.2 m/s)	6.90 (w: +0.2 m/s)	6.90 (w: +0.2 m/s)	
15	Pa Momodou Gai	Gambia	6.78 (w: +1.4 m/s)	6.60 (w: +0.3 m/s)	6.53 (w: -0.2 m/s)	6.78 (w: +1.4 m/s)	
16	Irvin Tahmaz	Bosnia and Herzegovina	6.65 w (w: +2.2 m/s)	6.40 (w: +1.3 m/s)	6.14 (w: +0.8 m/s)	6.65 w (w: +2.2 m/s)	
17	Donny Magnan	Seychelles	6.06 w (w: +2.2 m/s)	6.10 w (w: +2.5 m/s)	x	6.10 w (w: +2.5 m/s)	
	Kenneth Kastrén	Finland	x	x	x	NM	

==== Group B ====
Rank	Name	Nationality	Attempts			Result	Notes
Rank	Name	Nationality	1	2	3	Result	Notes
1	Gregor Cankar	Slovenia	x	6.76 (w: +1.4 m/s)	7.79 (w: +1.8 m/s)	7.79 (w: +1.8 m/s)	Q
2	Andrej Benda	Slovakia	7.76 (w: +0.3 m/s)	-	-	7.76 (w: +0.3 m/s)	Q
3	Andrew Channer	Canada	x	7.50 (w: +1.2 m/s)	7.56 (w: +1.1 m/s)	7.56 (w: +1.1 m/s)	q
4	Lenard Cobb	United States	7.34 (w: +1.4 m/s)	7.56 (w: +0.2 m/s)	x	7.56 (w: +0.2 m/s)	q
5	Dmitriy Myshka	Ukraine	7.14 (w: -0.3 m/s)	7.21 (w: +0.6 m/s)	7.55 (w: +2.0 m/s)	7.55 (w: +2.0 m/s)	q
6	Bogdan Țăruș	Romania	7.21 (w: 0.0 m/s)	7.52 (w: -1.5 m/s)	7.52 (w: +1.4 m/s)	7.52 (w: -1.5 m/s)	q
7	Andrey Sazykin	Russia	7.29 (w: +0.4 m/s)	7.51 (w: +1.6 m/s)	7.23 (w: +0.9 m/s)	7.51 (w: +1.6 m/s)	q
8	Antti Kolkka	Finland	x	7.32 (w: +1.3 m/s)	7.36 (w: +1.0 m/s)	7.36 (w: +1.0 m/s)	
9	Marco Rajic	Yugoslavia	7.22 w (w: +2.9 m/s)	7.02 (w: +1.0 m/s)	7.34 (w: +1.2 m/s)	7.34 (w: +1.2 m/s)	
10	Daisuke Watanabe	Japan	6.45 w (w: +2.3 m/s)	x	7.33 (w: +1.1 m/s)	7.33 (w: +1.1 m/s)	
11	Nabil Adamou	Algeria	7.32 (w: +0.4 m/s)	x	7.11 (w: +0.7 m/s)	7.32 (w: +0.4 m/s)	
12	Niels Kruller	Netherlands	7.09 (w: +0.5 m/s)	7.08 (w: -0.3 m/s)	7.28 (w: +1.2 m/s)	7.28 (w: +1.2 m/s)	
13	Ciaran McDonagh	Ireland	x	6.91 (w: +0.8 m/s)	7.25 (w: +1.7 m/s)	7.25 (w: +1.7 m/s)	
14	Nikólaos Kardamakis	Greece	7.21 (w: +0.6 m/s)	x	7.24 (w: +1.0 m/s)	7.24 (w: +1.0 m/s)	
15	Younès Moudrik	Morocco	6.97 (w: +0.7 m/s)	7.24 w (w: +2.1 m/s)	7.16 (w: +1.1 m/s)	7.24 w (w: +2.1 m/s)	
16	Elston Cawley	Jamaica	7.03 (w: +1.5 m/s)	7.12 (w: +1.0 m/s)	6.85 (w: +1.2 m/s)	7.12 (w: +1.0 m/s)	
17	Han Yeong-In	South Korea	5.13 (w: +1.8 m/s)	6.64 (w: 0.0 m/s)	6.85 (w: -0.8 m/s)	6.85 (w: -0.8 m/s)	

== Participation ==
According to an unofficial count, 35 athletes from 28 countries participated in the event.

- Algeria (1)
- Australia (1)
- Bosnia and Herzegovina (1)
- Canada (1)
- China (1)
- Croatia (1)
- Finland (2)
- France (1)
- Gambia (1)
- Greece (2)
- Ireland (1)
- Jamaica (1)
- Japan (2)
- Morocco (1)
- Netherlands (2)
- Poland (1)
- Portugal (1)
- Romania (1)
- Russia (2)
- Seychelles (1)
- Slovakia (2)
- Slovenia (1)
- South Africa (1)
- South Korea (1)
- Togo (1)
- Ukraine (1)
- United States (2)
- Yugoslavia (1)
