= PP-111 Faisalabad-XIV =

Constituency of the Provincial Assembly of Punjab

- Constituency for the Provincial Assembly of Punjab
- Region: Faisalabad city area in Faisalabad District

Current constituency
- Created from: PP-67 Faisalabad-XVII (2002-2018); PP-116 Faisalabad-XX (2018-2023)

PP-111 Faisalabad-XIV (پی پی-111، فیصل آباد-14) is a Constituency of Provincial Assembly of Punjab.

== General elections 2024 ==
Provincial election 2024: PP-111 Faisalabad-XIV
Party	Candidate	Votes	%	±%
Independent	Basharat Ali (Note: Filed nomination papers as PTI candidate but ECP allowed him to run as an Independent)	45,599	46.28	
PML(N)	Faqir Hussain	36,373	36.92	
TLP	Muhammad Hamid Raza	8,691	8.82	
Others	Others (twenty three candidates)	7,864	7.98	
Turnout		101,104	49.65	
Total valid votes		98,527	97.45	
Rejected ballots		2,577	2.55	
Majority		9,226	9.36	
Registered electors		203,645		
hold				

== General elections 2018 ==
Provincial election 2018: PP-116 Faisalabad-XX
Party	Candidate	Votes	%	±%
PML(N)	Faqir Hussain	48,619	47.41	
PTI	Mahboob Alam	43,014	41.94	
TLP	Muhammad Zahid Shahzad	6,484	6.32	
AAT	Muhammad Younas Shad	2,557	2.49	
PPP	Ashfaq Hussain	1,552	1.51	
Others	Others (two candidates)	333	0.33	
Turnout		103,934	57.63	
Total valid votes		102,559	98.68	
Rejected ballots		1,375	1.32	
Majority		5,605	5.47	
Registered electors		180,355		

== General elections 2013 ==
Provincial election 2013: PP-67 Faisalabad-XVII
Party	Candidate	Votes	%	±%
PML(N)	Faqir Hussain	60,964	57.82	
PTI	Ch. Mehboob Alam Sindhu	34,189	32.43	
PPP	Dr. Muhammad Munir Zafar	4,354	4.13	
JI	Ajmal Hussain	2,763	2.62	
APML	Mudassar Nazar Butt	1,772	1.68	
Others	Others (twenty one candidates)	1,398	1.33	
Turnout		106,814	59.18	
Total valid votes		105,440	98.71	
Rejected ballots		1,374	1.29	
Majority		26,775	25.39	
Registered electors		180,495		

== General elections 2008 ==
Contesting candidates	Party affiliation	Votes polled

== See also ==
- PP-110 Faisalabad-XIII
- PP-112 Faisalabad-XV
