= Zafar Iqbal (athlete) =

Pakistani triple jumper (born 1982)

Zafar Iqbal ظفر اقبال
Personal information
- Nationality: Pakistani
- Born: 10 April 1982 (age 44) Pakistan

Sport
- Country: Pakistan
- Sport: Track and field
- Event: Triple jump
Medal record
Men's athletics
Representing Pakistan
South Asian Games
Gold medal – first place	2010 Dhaka	Triple jump
Silver medal – second place	2004 Islamabad	Triple jump
South Asian Championships
Gold medal – first place	2008 Kochi	Triple jump
Silver medal – second place	2008 Kochi	4×100m

Zafar Iqbal (Urdu: ظفر اقبال; born 10 April 1982) is a Pakistani triple jumper. He won a gold medal in the triple jump event of the 2010 South Asian Games in Dhaka, 2010.

Zafar Iqbal is sergeant in Pakistan Army, and he is currently serving in 18 Punjab "The Desert Hawks". This renowned unit of Pakistan Army has produced number of national and international sportsmen. Iqbal is now working as a coach for triple jump and long jump.

== See also ==
- List of Pakistani records in athletics
- Athletics in Pakistan
