= Athletics at the 2002 Asian Games – Men's 400 metres hurdles =

Men's 400 metres hurdles at the 2002 Asian Games
- Venue: Busan Asiad Main Stadium
- Dates: 7–8 October 2002
- Competitors: 12 from 10 nations

Medalists
gold medal	Hadi Soua'an Al-Somaily	Saudi Arabia
silver medal	Mubarak Al-Nubi	Qatar
bronze medal	Dai Tamesue	Japan

The men's 400 metres hurdles competition at the 2002 Asian Games in Busan, South Korea was held on 7–8 October at the Busan Asiad Main Stadium.

== Schedule ==
All times are Korea Standard Time (UTC+09:00)

Date	Time	Event
Monday, 7 October 2002	15:30	1st round
Tuesday, 8 October 2002	14:20	Final

== Records ==
Prior to this competition, the existing world, Asian and Games records were as follows.

World Record	Kevin Young (USA)	46.78	Barcelona, Spain	6 August 1992
Asian Record	Hadi Soua'an Al-Somaily (KSA)	47.53	Sydney, Australia	27 September 2000
Games Record	Shunji Karube (JPN); Yoshihiko Saito (JPN)	49.13	Hiroshima, Japan; Hiroshima, Japan	11 October 1994; 11 October 1994

== Results ==
=== 1st round ===
- Qualification: First 3 in each heat (Q) and the next 2 fastest (q) advance to the final.

==== Heat 1 ====
Rank	Athlete	Time	Notes
1	Ken Yoshizawa (JPN)	50.65	Q
2	Allah Ditta (PAK)	50.77	Q
3	Chen Tien-wen (TPE)	51.05	Q
4	Jirachai Linglom (THA)	51.19	
5	Ibrahim Al-Hamaidi (KSA)	51.56	
6	Basil Al-Fadhli (KUW)	52.17	

==== Heat 2 ====
Rank	Athlete	Time	Notes
1	Mubarak Al-Nubi (QAT)	48.76	Q, GR
2	Hadi Soua'an Al-Somaily (KSA)	49.03	Q
3	Dai Tamesue (JPN)	49.66	Q
4	Yevgeniy Meleshenko (KAZ)	49.82	q
5	Ashoka Jayasundara (SRI)	50.40	q
6	Lee Du-yeon (KOR)	50.73	

=== Final ===
Rank	Athlete	Time	Notes
1st place, gold medalist(s)	Hadi Soua'an Al-Somaily (KSA)	48.42	GR
2nd place, silver medalist(s)	Mubarak Al-Nubi (QAT)	48.98	
3rd place, bronze medalist(s)	Dai Tamesue (JPN)	49.29	
4	Yevgeniy Meleshenko (KAZ)	49.84	
5	Chen Tien-wen (TPE)	50.46	
6	Ken Yoshizawa (JPN)	50.88	
7	Allah Ditta (PAK)	51.22	
8	Ashoka Jayasundara (SRI)	51.75	
