= Athletics at the 2010 South Asian Games =

Athletics at the 11th South Asian Games
- Dates: February 6 – February 9
- Host city: Dhaka, Bangladesh
- Venue: Bangabandhu National Stadium
- Level: Senior
- Events: 23
- Participation: 8 nations
- Records set: ?

At the 2010 South Asian Games, the athletics events were held at the Bangabandhu National Stadium in Dhaka, Bangladesh from February 6 to February 9. A total of 23 events were contested, of which 15 by male and 8 by female athletes.

India (10 golds) had the greatest medal haul of the six countries which reached the medal table, shortly followed by Sri Lanka (8 golds). Stand out performers included Chandrika Subashini, who took the 200/400 metres double, and Pakistan's Naseem Hameed, who was a rank outsider before the games but won the women's 100 metres race over more-fancied opposition. Following her victory, the Senate of Pakistan passed a resolution to improve her family's poor living standards and reward her with professional training.

The marathon race caused much controversy as Rajendra Bahadur Bhandari, returning from a doping violation from the 2006 South Asian Games, finished in first place. Furthermore, a miscalculation caused by a change in finishing location resulted in a course of only 35 km (over 5 km short of the true marathon distance). Following an investigation, the athletes' positions remained unchanged, although their times were barred from the record books.

== Records ==
| Name | Event | Country | Record | Type |
|---|---|---|---|---|
| Priyangika Madumanthi | High jump | Sri Lanka | 1.81 m | =GR |
| Azharul Islam | Discus throw | Bangladesh | 44.98 m | NR |
| Sumita Rani | 100 m hurdles | Bangladesh | 13.99 m | NR |

== Medal summary ==
=== Men ===
| Event | Gold | | Silver | | Bronze | |
|---|---|---|---|---|---|---|
| 100 metres | Shehan Ambepitiya (SRI) | 10.46 | Abdul Najeeb Qureshi (IND) | 10.56 | Liaqat Ali (PAK) | 10.63 |
| 200 metres | Abdul Najeeb Qureshi (IND) | 21.16 | Shehan Ambepitiya (SRI) | 21.19 | Liaqat Ali (PAK) | 21.27 |
| 400 metres | Bibin Mathew (IND) | 47.25 | Prasanna Sampath Amarasekara (SRI) | 47.36 | Shake Mortaja (IND) | 47.53 |
| 1500 metres | Chaminda Wijekoon (SRI) | 4:10.01 | Sunil Kumar (IND) | 4:10.57 | P.H. Chamal (SRI) | 4:10.97 |
| 5000 metres | Sunil Kumar (IND) | 14:23.83 | Mohammad Yunus (IND) | 14:24.22 | Chaminda Wijekoon (SRI) | 14:47.68 |
| 110 metre hurdles | Mohsin Ali (PAK) | 14.56 | Sandeep Parmar (IND) | 14.76 | P. Muthuswamy (IND) | 14.88 |
| 400 metre hurdles | T. Balamurugan (IND) | 52.24 | Nawaz Haq (PAK) | 52.52 | Avin A. Thomas (IND) | 52.52 |
| 4×100 metre relay | Sri Lanka (SRI); W.J.Y.T. Fernando; Shehan Ambepitiya; D.R. Ashan Hasaranga; Shiwantha M. Weerasooriya | 40.02 | India (IND); Abdul Najeeb Quereshi; Sivadasan Nair Arunjith; Sameer Mon; Ritesh Anand | 40.18 | Maldives (MDV); Hassan Saaid; Hussain Haleem; Azneem Ahmed; Ali Shareef | 41.39 NR |
| 4×400 metre relay | India (IND); Bibin Mathew; K. Mathew Binu; V. B. Bineesh; Shake K. Mortaja | 3:08.62 | Sri Lanka (SRI); Rohan Pradeep Kumara; Rohitha Pushpakumara; Prasanna S. Amarasekara; U.G. Wickramesinghe | 3:08.94 | Pakistan (PAK); Ali Amir Murad; Tahir Shafiq; Asad Iqbal; Ali Muhammad | 3:16.70 |
| Marathon | Rajendra Bahadur Bhandari (NEP) | N/A | Ajith Bandara Adikari (SRI) | N/A | Ram Singh Yadav (IND) | N/A |
| High jump | Harishankar Roy (IND) | 2.16 | Nikhil Chittarasu (IND) | 2.13 | Nalin Priyantha (SRI) | 2.13 |
| Long jump | Mohammad Ibrar (IND) | 7.44 | Nayana Dharmaratne (SRI) | 7.25 | Ali Amin (BAN) | 7.19 |
| Triple jump | Zafar Iqbal (PAK) | 16.05 | Saurabh Singh (IND) | 15.27 | Nishan Kumara (SRI) | 15.19 |
| Discus throw | Basharat Ali (PAK) | 52.43 | Simranjeet Singh (IND) | 49.18 | Azharul Islam (BAN) | 44.98 NR |
| Javelin throw | Kashinath Naik (IND) | 74.27 | Muhammad Imran (PAK) | 73.38 | Samarjeet Singh (IND) | 71.65 |

=== Women ===
| Event | Gold | | Silver | | Bronze | |
|---|---|---|---|---|---|---|
| 100 metres | Naseem Hameed (PAK) | 11.81 | Pramila Priyadarshini (SRI) | 11.93 | Achala Shalika Dias (SRI) | 11.93 |
| 200 metres | Chandrika Subashini (SRI) | 24.49 | Pramila Priyadarshini (SRI) | 24.63 | Jauna Murmu (IND) | 24.87 |
| 400 metres | Chandrika Subashini (SRI) | 54.27 | Priyanka Pawar (IND) | 54.98 | A. C. Ashwini (IND) | 55.51 |
| 100 metre hurdles | G. Gayathri (IND) | 13.98 | Sumita Rani (BAN) | 13.99 NR | Jasmin Akhter (BAN) | 14.05 |
| 4×100 metre relay | Sri Lanka (SRI); N.C.D. Priyadharshani; Achala Shalika Dias; H.P. Sujani Buddika; D.D. Premila Priyadharshani | 46.33 | Bangladesh (BAN); Sumita Rani; Jasmine Akhter; Shamsun Nahar Chumky; Ishrat Jahan Eva | 46.80 NR | Pakistan (PAK); Naseem Hameed; Javeria Hassan; Nadia Nazir; Sadaf Siddiqui | 47.16 |
| 4×400 metre relay | India (IND); Jauna Murmu; A. C. Ashwini; Tiana Mary Thomas; Priyanka Pawar | 3:38.62 | Sri Lanka (SRI); T Kumari; Menike Wickramasinghe; E.W. Upamalika Ratna Kumari; Chandrika Subashini | 3:44.81 | Bangladesh (BAN) | 3:52.29 NR |
| High jump | Priyangika Madumanthi (SRI) | 1.81 =GR | Sahana Kumari (IND) | 1.79 | Dulangalee Kumari (SRI) | 1.72 |
| Long jump | Chamali Dilrukshi (SRI) | 6.20 | Reshmi Bose (IND) | 6.09 | M. A. Prajusha (IND) | 5.96 |

== Medal table ==
* Host nation (Bangladesh)

| Rank | Nation | Gold | Silver | Bronze | Total |
|---|---|---|---|---|---|
| 1 | India (IND) | 10 | 11 | 8 | 29 |
| 2 | Sri Lanka (SRI) | 8 | 8 | 6 | 22 |
| 3 | Pakistan (PAK) | 4 | 2 | 4 | 10 |
| 4 | Nepal (NEP) | 1 | 0 | 0 | 1 |
| 5 | Bangladesh (BAN)* | 0 | 2 | 4 | 6 |
| 6 | Maldives (MDV) | 0 | 0 | 1 | 1 |
| Totals (6 entries) | | 23 | 23 | 23 | 69 |
