= Myra Lakdawala =

Pakistani athlete

- Born: Chicago, Illinois

Myra Nur Lakdawala known as Myra Lakdawala is an American-born former athlete from Pakistan. She is the national record holder in 3,000m.

== Early life and education ==
Lakdawala was born in Chicago, USA to Parvez and Rozina Lakdawala. She was educated at the Karachi American School. Later, she received her bachelor's degree in English and Philosophy from the University of the Pacific in California, America.

== Career ==
Lakdawala established a new record for Pakistan at the Johnny Mathis Invitational in San Francisco in 2019 by breaking an old record set by Olympic runner Sumaira Zahoor. She finished with 19 minutes and 3.01 seconds on the clock for the five-kilometer race. Out of a total of 33 participants from universities and colleges all over Northern California, Lakdawala achieved 20th position.

She is also the first Pakistani lady to have represented her country in the National Collegiate Athletic Association (NCAA).

She also earned a gold medal for women's 1500 m race at the Jubilee Games held in Dubai in 2016.
