= Sumaira Zahoor =

Pakistani track and field athlete (born 1979)

Medal record

Women's Athletics

Representing Pakistan

Women Islamic Games
Silver medal – second place	2005 Tehran	1500m
Bronze medal – third place	2005 Tehran	4x400m

South Asian Games
Silver medal – second place	2004 Islamabad	1500m
Bronze medal – third place	2004 Islamabad	4 × 400 m relay
Bronze medal – third place	2006 Colombo	4 × 400 m relay

South Asian Championships
Bronze medal – third place	2008 Kochi	4×400m

Sumaira Zahoor (born August 15, 1979) is a Pakistani sprinter. She became only the fourth female from Pakistan to compete at an Olympics when she took part in the women's 1500 metres event at the 2004 Summer Olympics.

In 2005, she participated in the 4th Women's Islamic Games in Tehran where she won a silver medal in the 1500 m and a bronze in the 4 × 400 m relay.

== See also ==
- List of Pakistani records in athletics
- Athletics in Pakistan
- Pakistan at the Olympics
