= Irvin Tahmaz =

Bosnian athlete

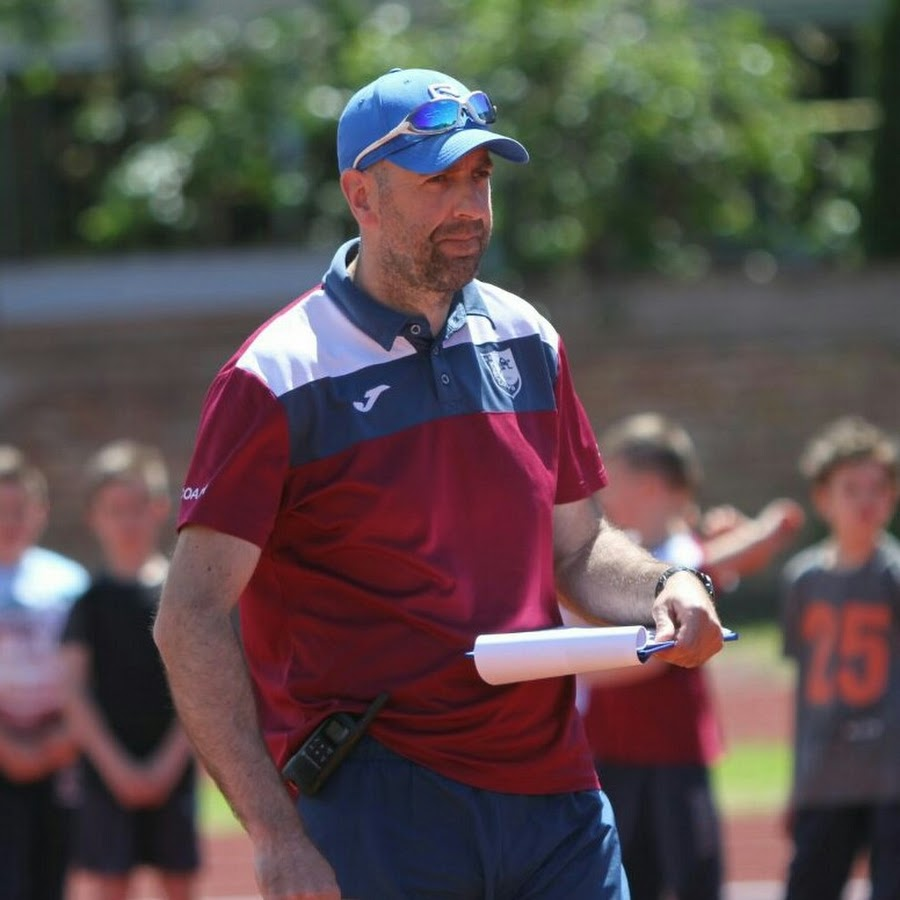

Personal information
- Nationality: Bosnia and Herzegovina
- Born: 28 January 1976 (age 49) Sarajevo, Bosnia and Herzegovina

Sport
- Sport: Athletics
- Event: Long jump

Irvin Tahmaz (born 28 January 1976) is a retired Bosnian long jumper and athletic coach. He competed in the men's long jump event at the 1994 World Junior Championships in Athletics.

== Personal life ==
Tahmaz was born on January 28, 1976, in Sarajevo, Bosnia and Herzegovina, to Bosniak parents Osman and Naza Tahmaz. Irvin is married to Emina; together, they have a daughter, Lamija, who also competes in long jumping.

== Career ==
From 1998 to 2017, Irvin held the indoor 200 metres record in Bosnia and Herzegovina; after 19 years, the record was finally broken by Rusmir Malkočević. Other than the 200 metres record, Irvin had previously held the 400 metres and 800 metres records in Bosnia and Herzegovina.

Irvin serves as vice president of the Sarajevo-based Triathlon Club Delta, which is administered by the Olympic Committee of Bosnia and Herzegovina. The organization runs an annual international triathlon cup Kulin Ban, which Irvin took part in 2012.

Irvin currently works as an athletic coach at AK Bosna, which in 2016 received a renovated athletic track meeting World Athletics standards. Irvin is also one of the coaches for running school Salomon, which offers curated running trails that highlight historical landmarks and natural beauty in his hometown of Sarajevo, alongside a focus on proper running techniques and community engagement.

== International competitions ==
Representing Bosnia and Herzegovina
Year	Competition	Venue	Position	Event	Result	Notes
1994	1994 World Junior Championships in Athletics – Men's long jump	Lisbon University Stadium	Long jump	6.65 w		
