= Naseem Hameed =

Pakistani sprinter (born 1988)

Personal information
- Born: 1 May 1988 (age 38) Karachi, Pakistan

Sport
- Country: Pakistan
- Sport: Track and field
- Event: 100 metres
Medal record
Women's athletics
Representing Pakistan
South Asian Games
Gold medal – first place	2010 Dhaka	100 m
Silver medal – second place	2006 Colombo	4 × 100 m relay
Bronze medal – third place	2010 Dhaka	4 × 100 m relay

Naseem Hameed PP (Urdu: نسيم حميد; born 1 May 1988) is a Pakistani track and field athlete, who became the fastest woman in South Asia when she won a gold medal in the 100 metres at the 2010 South Asian Games in Dhaka. She is the current national record holder in 100 m.

== Career ==
Naseem started her career as an athlete from her school. She participated in various sports activities at school and college levels. During her time in college, she was noticed by Army coaches and was allowed to practice in Army grounds near Korangi. She won various local events after this and was then picked by Pakistan Railways as an athlete. Naseem consistent performance earned her a place to represent Pakistan in 2010 SAF Games in Dhaka where she won the Coveted Gold in 100 Meters clocking 11.81 gaining the title of Fastest Women in South Asia and emerged as the queen of the track.

On 12 February 2010, President of Pakistan Asif Ali Zardari appointed Naseem as Ambassador of Sports in recognition of her success at the SAF Games. In July 2010 Pakistan's leading Mobile operator Mobilink has added Naseem to its panel of brand ambassadors. Bilal Munir Sheikh, Vice President of Mobilink Pakistan said on the ceremony of unveiling the song based on Hameed’s struggle and accomplishments and commemorating those who helped her achieve her goals that:

“Mobilink Jazz believes strongly in the bonds we create and the objective of this tribute is to encourage all those who dream to reach out their loved ones for support so they can achieve what they want to, and much more. Naseem is a hero we all needed and we hope that through the Jazz platform she will inspire many more. We are indeed very proud and privileged to have her as our Brand Ambassador.”

== Biopic ==
A telefilm Bhaag Amina Bhaag based upon a real and untold life story of Naseem Hameed aired on Geo TV. The telefilm was a commendable effort to give tribute to great female Pakistani athlete. The drama was directed by Yasir Nawaz and produced by Sameena Humayun Saeed. The lead role of Naseem Hameed was played by Aamina Sheikh. The film draws out attention to a girl who wants to live her dreams and aspirations despite the difficult situation she has to go through to get them, a story which is deeply rooted in our society.

== Awards ==
Ribbon	Decoration	Country	Year
	Pride of Performance	Pakistan	2010

Naseem was awarded the Pride of Performance in 2010 in recognition of her achievements and contributions to athletics.

== See also ==
- List of Pakistani records in athletics
- Athletics in Pakistan
