= Pakistani Athletics Championships =

Annual national sports competition

- Sport: Track and field
- Founded: 1948
- Country: Pakistan

The National Athletics Championships of Pakistan is an annual outdoor track and field competition organised by the Athletics Federation of Pakistan. Serving as the country's premier athletic event, it typically takes place in April and crowns the national champions across various disciplines in sports.

== Events ==
22 events for men and 20 for women are held.

Track running

- 100 metres, 200 metres, 400 metres, 800 metres, 1500 metres, 5000 metres, 10,000 metres

Obstacle events

- 100 metres hurdles (women only), 110 metres hurdles (men only), 400 metres hurdles, 3000 metres steeplechase

Jumping events

- Pole vault, high jump, long jump, triple jump

Throwing events

- Shot put, discus throw, javelin throw, hammer throw

Combined events

- Decathlon (men only), heptathlon (women only)

Relay

- 4 × 100 metres relay, 4 × 400 metres relay

Long events

- Marathon (men only), 20 km race walk (men only), 50 km race walk

== Editions ==
| Year | City |
|---|---|
| 1948 | Karachi |
| 1950 | Lahore |
| 1952 | Lahore |
| 1954 | Montgomery |
| 1955 | Dacca |
| 1956 | Lahore |
| 1958 | Peshawar |
| 1960 | Dacca |
| 1962 | Lahore |
| 1963 | Lahore |
| 1964 | Dacca |
| 1965 | Lahore |
| 1966 | Lahore |
| 1967 | Rawalpindi |
| 1968 | Dacca |
| 1969 | Peshawar |
| 1970 | Karachi |
| 1971 | Nawabshah |
| 1972 | Lahore |
| 1973 | Lahore |
| 1974 | Peshawar |
| 1975 | Lahore |
| 1976 | Karachi |
| 1977 | Peshawar |
| 1978 | Lahore |
| 1979 | Rawalpindi |
| 1980 | Karachi |
| 1981 | Peshawar |
| 1982 | Rawalpindi |
| 1983 | Hyderabad |
| 1984 | Faisalabad |
| 1985 | Islamabad |
| 1986 | Quetta |
| 1987 | Rawalpindi |
| 1988 | Karachi |
| 1990 | Peshawar |
| 1991 | Islamabad |
| 1992 | Lahore |
| 1993 | Quetta |
| 1994 | Islamabad |
| 1995 | Quetta |
| 2009 | Lahore |
| 2010 | Islamabad |
| 2011 | Lahore |
| 2012 | Islamabad |
| 2013 | Islamabad |
| 2015 | Islamabad |
| 2016 | Quetta |
| 2017 | Karachi |
| 2018 | Islamabad |
2019–2021 not held
| 2022 | Lahore |
| 2023 | Attock |

50th edition will take place in 2021 with 14 teams Pakistan Army, Pakistan Air Force (PAF), Pakistan Navy, Pakistan WAPDA, Pakistan Railways, Higher Education Commission (HEC), Punjab, Sindh, Khyber Pakhtunkhwa, Balochistan, Islamabad, Azad Jammu and Kashmir, FATA and Gilgit Baltistan.

== Championships records ==
=== Men ===
| Event | Record | Athlete/Team | Date | Place | Ref. |
|---|---|---|---|---|---|
| 400 m | 46.75 (Note: recognised by World Athletics but not ratified by AFP) | Mehboob Ali | 10 May 2016 | Quetta | |
| 110 m hurdles | 13.85 NR | Mohsin Ali | 22 March 2012 | Islamabad | |
| High jump | 2.07 m NR | Shehroz Khan | 18 November 2018 | Islamabad | |
| Pole vault | 4.94 m NR | Jaffar Ashraf | 6 Dezember 2023 | Attock | |
| 4 × 100 m relay | 40.24 (Note: recognised by World Athletics but not ratified by AFP) | Team Army; Muhammad Shahbaz; Liaqat Ali; Ubaid Ali; Ahmad Uzair | 11 May 2016 | Quetta | |

=== Women ===
| Event | Record | Athlete/Team | Date | Place | Ref. |
|---|---|---|---|---|---|
| 5000 m | 19:04.0 h NR | Rabia Ashiq | 20 May 2012 | Islamabad | |
| 10,000 m | 40:42.7 NR | Rabia Ashiq | 21 April 2011 | Lahore | |
| Javelin throw | 44.78 m NR | Parveen Akhtar | 6 July 2010 | Karachi | |

=== Mixed ===
| Event | Record | Team | Date | Place | Ref. |
|---|---|---|---|---|---|
| 4 × 400 m relay | 3:39.2 h | HEC Team; Amed Saeed; Sunaina Musawar; Fahad Khan; Rida Tariq | 6 Dezember 2023 | Attock | |

== See also ==
- Athletics in Pakistan
- List of Pakistani records in athletics
