= Shahnawaz =

Shahnawaz may refer to:

- Begum Jahanara Shahnawaz (1896–1979), politician in British India and in Pakistan
- Mumtaz Shahnawaz (1912–1948), Pakistani diplomat and writer
- Shahnawaz Bhutto (1958–1985), the son of Zulfiqar Ali Bhutto and Begum Nusrat Bhutto
- Shahnawaz Tanai (1950–2022), former Afghan communist general and politician
- Syed Shahnawaz Hussain (born 1968), former Indian federal minister and a politician of the Bharatiya Janata Party
- Tanveer Shahnawaz, Canadian politician
