= Shigeru Tagawa =

Japanese long jumper

Personal information
- Nationality: Japanese
- Born: 22 November 1975 (age 50) Niigata Prefecture, Japan
- Education: Tokai University
- Height: 1.81 m (5 ft 11 in)
- Weight: 75 kg (165 lb)

Sport
- Country: Japan
- Sport: Track and field
- Event: Long jump

Achievements and titles
- Personal best: 8.15 m (Gifu 1999)
Medal record
Men's athletics
Representing Japan
Asian Championships
Bronze medal – third place	1998 Fukuoka	Long jump
World Junior Championships
Bronze medal – third place	1994 Lisbon	Long jump

Shigeru Tagawa (田川 茂, Tagawa Shigeru; born 22 November 1975 in Niigata Prefecture) is a Japanese long jumper. He competed at the 1999 World Championships without reaching the final.

== Personal best ==
Event	Performance	Competition	Venue	Date
Long jump	8.15 m (wind: +2.0 m/s)	National Corporate Championships	Gifu, Japan	12 June 1999

== International competition ==
Year	Competition	Venue	Position	Event	Performance
Representing Japan
1994	World Junior Championships	Lisbon, Portugal	3rd	Long jump	7.85 m (wind: +2.2 m/s)
1998	Asian Championships	Fukuoka, Japan	3rd	Long jump	7.96 m (wind: +0.8 m/s)
1999	World Championships	Seville, Spain	21st (q)	Long jump	7.78 m (wind: -0.6 m/s)
2000	Asian Championships	Jakarta, Indonesia	8th	Long jump	7.62 m

== National title ==
- Japanese Championships
  - Long jump: 1996
