= Daisuke Watanabe (long jumper) =

Japanese long jumper

Personal information
- Nationality: Japanese
- Born: 29 May 1975 (age 51) Tokyo, Japan
- Education: Nihon University
- Height: 185 cm (6 ft 1 in)
- Weight: 74 kg (163 lb)

Sport
- Country: Japan
- Sport: Athletics
- Event: Long jump
- Personal best: 8.12 m (Sapporo 1999)
Medal record
Asian Junior Championships
Silver medal – second place	1992 New Delhi	Long jump

Daisuke Watanabe (渡辺 大輔, Watanabe Daisuke; born 29 May 1975) is a Japanese track and field athlete. He competed in the men's long jump at the 2000 Summer Olympics.

His wife Ryoko (née Jojima) was the 1992 Asian junior champion in the 100 metres hurdles. His nephew Yuki Hashioka is the former Japanese record holder in the long jump.

He is currently the director and advisor of the track and field club at Hachioji High School. He coached his nephew Yuki Hashioka from 2014 to 2017.

== International competition ==
Year	Competition	Venue	Position	Event	Measure (m)
Representing Japan
1992	Asian Junior Championships	New Delhi, India	2nd	Long jump	7.50
1994	World Junior Championships	Lisbon, Portugal	17th (q)	Long jump	7.33 (wind: +1.1 m/s)
1999	World Championships	Seville, Spain	38th (q)	Long jump	7.41 (wind: -0.1 m/s)
2000	Olympic Games	Sydney, Australia	— (q)	Long jump	NM
2001	World Championships	Edmonton, Canada	25th (q)	Long jump	7.37 (wind: -0.1 m/s)

== National titles ==
- National Championships
  - Long jump: 2001
- National Sports Festival
  - Long jump (Boys A): 1992, 1993
