= Pakistan at the 2023 World Athletics Championships =

- Flag of Pakistan
- WA code: PAK

in Budapest, Hungary 19 August 2023 – 27 August 2023
- Competitors: 1 (1 man and 0 women)
- Medals Ranked 27th: Gold 0 Silver 1 Bronze 0 Total 1

World Athletics Championships appearances (overview)
- 1983; 1987; 1991; 1993; 1995; 1997; 1999; 2001; 2003; 2005; 2007; 2009; 2011; 2013; 2015; 2017; 2019; 2022; 2023

Pakistan competed at the 2023 World Athletics Championships in Budapest, Hungary, which were held from 19 to 27 August 2023. The athlete delegation of the country was composed of one competitor, javelin thrower Arshad Nadeem who would compete in the men's javelin throw.

Nadeem would place second in the qualifying round of the event and qualified for the finals, additionally qualifying for the 2024 Summer Olympics. There, he would win the silver medal and earned a season's best, becoming the first ever Pakistani athlete to win a medal at the World Athletics Championships.

== Background ==
The 2023 World Athletics Championships in Budapest, Hungary, were held from 19 to 27 August 2023. The Championships were held at the National Athletics Centre. To qualify for the World Championships, athletes had to reach an entry standard (e.g. time or distance), place in a specific position at select competitions, be a wild card entry, or qualify through their World Athletics Ranking at the end of the qualification period.

Javelin thrower Arshad Nadeem would be the sole representative for the nation at the championships. The direct qualification period of the event was from 31 July 2022 to 30 July 2023. He qualified after he had thrown 90.18 metres at the 2022 Commonwealth Games, which was in the entry standard of 85.20 metres.

== Medalists ==
Medal	Name	Event	Date
Silver	Arshad Nadeem	Men's javelin throw	27 August

== Results ==
Key

- Q = Qualified for the next round
- q = Qualified for the next round as a fastest loser or, in field events, by position without achieving the qualifying target
- NR = National record
- PB = Personal best
- SB = Season best
- N/A = Round not applicable for the event

=== Men ===
Nadeem participated in the qualifying round of the men's javelin throw on 25 August. His best throw of 86.79 metres would place him second behind Neeraj Chopra of India, qualifying for the finals and the 2024 Summer Olympics. Nadeem would compete in the finals of the event two days later against 11 other competitors. His best throw of 87.82 metres would earn him the silver medal and a new season's best. This medal would be the first medal for Pakistan at any edition of the World Athletics Championships.

Field events

Athlete	Event	Qualification		Final	
Athlete	Event	Distance	Position	Distance	Position
Arshad Nadeem	Javelin throw	86.79	2 Q	87.82 SB	2nd place, silver medalist(s)
