= Sybil Sohail =

Pakistani powerlifter and weightlifter

Personal information
- Nationality: Pakistani
- Born: c. 1993–1994 Lahore, Punjab, Pakistan

Sport
- Sport: Powerlifting / Weightlifting
- Club: Punjab University Sports Complex, Lahore
- Coached by: Rashid Malik
Medal record
Women's Powerlifting and Weightlifting
Representing Pakistan
Asian Weightlifting Masters Championship
Gold medal – first place	2025 Doha	59kg (W-30)
Asian Pacific African Compound Powerlifting Championship
Gold medal – first place	2024 South Africa	Powerlifting (×6)
Commonwealth Powerlifting Championship
Gold medal – first place	2024	Powerlifting (×6)
International Oceania Pacific Powerlifting Championship
Gold medal – first place	2017 Singapore	Squat
Gold medal – first place	2017 Singapore	Bench press
Gold medal – first place	2017 Singapore	Deadlift
Gold medal – first place	2017 Singapore	Overall (72kg)

Sybil Sohail (born c. 1993–94) is a Pakistani powerlifter and weightlifter from Lahore. She is the eldest of four sisters known as "Power Girls", family of strength-sport athletes. In June 2025, she became the first Pakistani woman to win a gold medal at the Asian Weightlifting Masters Championship.

== Early life and education ==
Sybil was born and raised in Lahore, Pakistan. Her father, Sohail Javed Khokhar, has supported his daughters' athletic careers throughout. She began competing in powerlifting around 2013, the year in which Pakistan's government established a women's weightlifting and powerlifting division. Her younger sister Twinkle Sohail, who in 2015 became the first Pakistani woman to win an international powerlifting gold medal, is credited with introducing her to the sport.

Sohail holds a Bachelor of Science in Sports Science and Physical Education from the University of the Punjab, Lahore, and is pursuing a doctoral degree. She trains at the Punjab University Sports Complex under coach Rashid Malik, who also coaches her sisters.

== Career ==
=== Powerlifting ===
Sybil began competing in powerlifting nationally from around 2013. Her first major international breakthrough came at the 2017 International Oceania Pacific Powerlifting Championship in Singapore, where she won gold medals in the squat, bench press, deadlift, and overall categories.

In 2018, all four Sohail sisters competed together at the ABP Championship in Dubai. The Asian Powerlifting Federation noted that it was the first time in its history that four sisters competed at any powerlifting event and all four won medals.

In 2024, Sybil, Twinkle, and Veronica competed at the Asian Pacific African Compound Powerlifting Championship in South Africa, winning a combined 15 gold medals, three silvers, and one bronze – with Sybil personally claiming six gold medals. She subsequently earned the titles of Commonwealth Powerlifting Champion and Asian Commonwealth Powerlifting Champion.

By the time of the 2025 Asian Weightlifting Championships, Sybil had accumulated at least 20 international medals and 36 national medals across her career in powerlifting.

=== Weightlifting ===
Though Sybil had long aspired to compete in Olympic weightlifting – a more technical discipline distinct from powerlifting – she missed the trials for Pakistan's national weightlifting squad for the 2016 South Asian Games due to a university exam conflict. She spent the following years training in both disciplines.

On 30 May 2025, competing at the Asian Weightlifting Masters Championship in Doha, Qatar, Sybil entered the W-30 59 kg category – her first-ever appearance at an international weightlifting event. She lifted a total of 95 kg (40 kg in the snatch and 55 kg in the clean and jerk) to win the gold medal, becoming the first Pakistani woman to win gold at the Asian Weightlifting Masters Championship.

== Personal life ==
Sybil is a member of Pakistan's Christian community in Lahore. She and her sisters are among the very few athletes from Pakistani religious minority communities to achieve significant international recognition in strength sports. The family trains at a small academy near Mozang Chungi in Lahore, which operates as the Twinkle Sohail Academy and is open to any women who wish to train in weightlifting or powerlifting.

Her father has publicly noted that despite their achievements, the sisters have received limited institutional or governmental financial support, with most competition expenses – including entry fees, doping tests, accommodation, and equipment – funded personally or through private sponsorship.
