= Rabia Ashiq =

Pakistani athlete (born 1992)

Personal information
- Born: 15 April 1992 (age 34) Lahore, Punjab, Pakistan
- Height: 163 cm (5 ft 4 in)
- Weight: 52 kg (115 lb)
Medal record
Women's athletics
Representing Pakistan
South Asian Games
Silver medal – second place	2019 Kathmandu	4 × 400 m relay

Rabia Ashiq (born 15 April 1992 in Lahore) is a Pakistani track and field athlete. She represented Pakistan at the Women's 800 metres event at the 2012 London Olympics. She is the current national record holder in 5000 m and 10,000 m events.

Ashiq represents Water and Power Development Authority (WAPDA) in national competitions.

In 2023, She received a three year ban from competition due to a doping violation.

== Personal bests ==
- 800 metres – 2:10:65 (2012)
- 5000 metres – 19:04.00 (2012) NR

== See also ==
- List of Pakistani records in athletics
- Athletics in Pakistan
- Pakistan at the Olympics
