= Athletics at the 2006 South Asian Games =

Athletics at the 10th South Asian Games
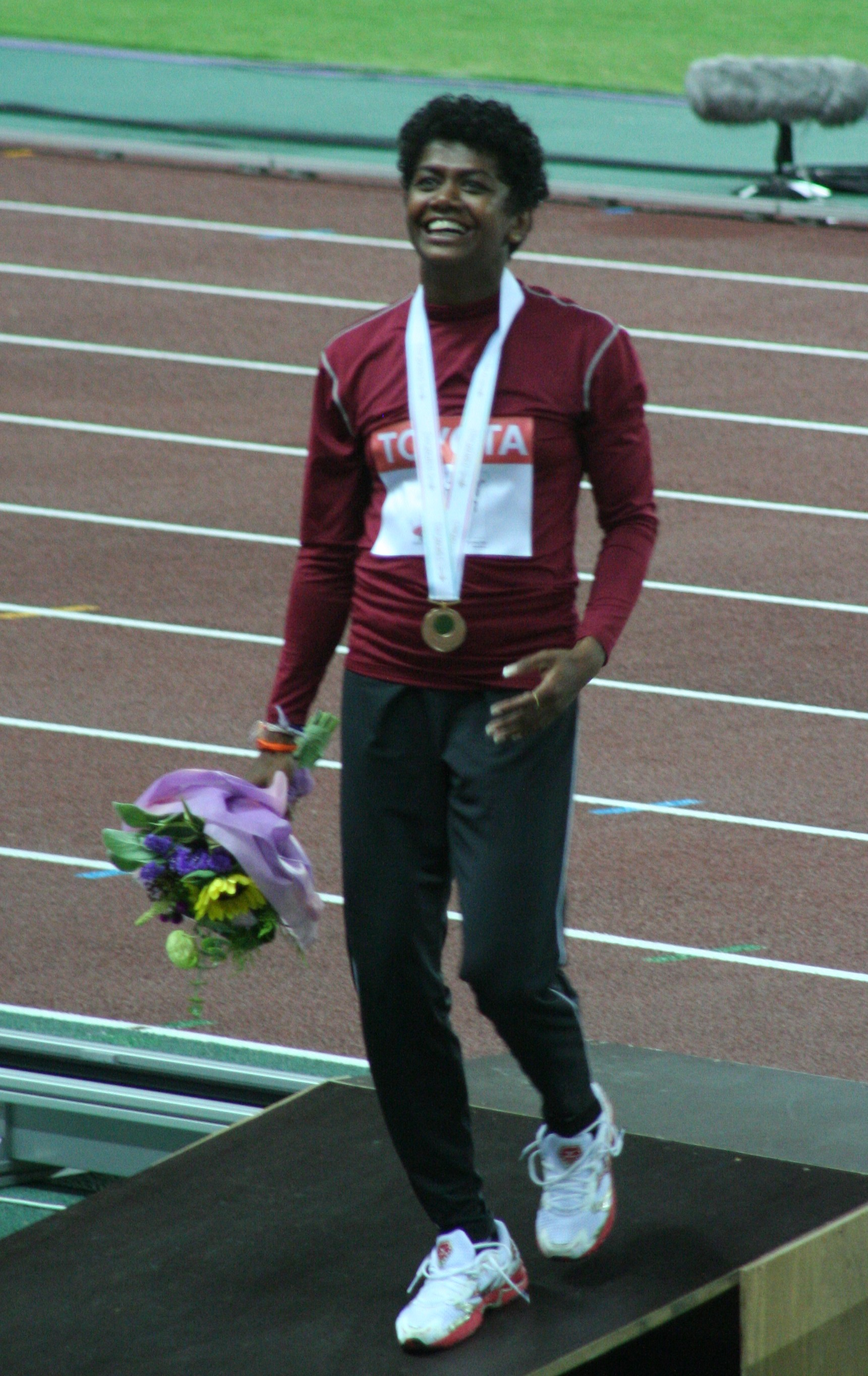
- Susanthika Jayasinghe was a triple gold medallist
- Dates: 23 August – 27 August
- Host city: Colombo, Sri Lanka
- Venue: Sugathadasa Stadium
- Level: Senior
- Events: 35
- Participation: ? athletes from 8 nations
- Records set: 5 Games records

At the 2006 South Asian Games, the athletics events were held at the Sugathadasa Stadium in Colombo, Sri Lanka from 23 August to 27 August 2006. A total of 35 events were contested, of which 20 by male and 15 by female athletes.

India was the most successful country, medals-wise, with a total of 43 medals, 15 of which were gold. The hosts Sri Lanka were the next best medal winner, having taken 14 gold medals. A total of 5 Games records were broken during the competition, which included world medallist Anju Bobby George's performance of 6.42 metres in the long jump. Susanthika Jayasinghe completed a 100 and 200 metres double, before going on to take the gold with the Sri Lankan relay team. Her male counterpart Rohan Pradeep Kumara achieved a similar feat, winning the 200 and 400 metres races, as well at the 400 m relay. Pinki Pramanik of India was another athlete to win two golds as she won the women's 400 and 800 metres finals.

Rajendra Bhandari of Nepal won a 5000 metres and 3000 metres steeplechase double, but his sample delivered at the Games tested positive for Norandrosterone. He was disqualified from the event and banned from competing for two years. Jani Chathurangani Silva, the 100 m silver medallist, was also banned for Norandrosterone.

== Records ==
Name	Event	Country	Record	Type
Anju Bobby George	Long jump	India	6.42 m	GR
Susanthika Jayasinghe; Buddika Sujani; Premila Priyadarshani; Jani Chathurangani	4×100 metre relay	Sri Lanka	44.63	GR
Preeja Sreedharan	10,000 metres	India	34:27.13	GR
Chaminda Sampath	Triple jump	Sri Lanka	16:26 m	GR
Surender Singh	10,000 metres	India	29:41.30	GR

Key:	WR — World record • AR — Area record • GR — Games record • NR — National record

== Medal summary ==
Key

Performance annulled

=== Men ===
Event	Gold		Silver		Bronze	
100 metres	Umanga Surendra (SRI)	10:52	Anil Kumar (IND)	10:53	Basak Jagdish (IND)	10:61
200 metres	Rohan Pradeep Kumara (SRI)	21.14	Vishal Saxena (IND)	21.51	Muhammad Imran (PAK)	21.52
400 metres	Rohan Pradeep Kumara (SRI)	46.33	Prasanna Amarasekera (SRI)	46.40	Rana Saheer Ahmed (PAK)	47.77
800 metres	Francis Sagayaraj (IND)	1:50:23	S. Abeynayaka (SRI)	1:50:30	W. Weliwita (SRI)	1:50:36
1500 metres	Hamza Chatholi (IND)	3:44.50	Chaminda Wijekoon (SRI)	3:45.60	P.H. Chamal (SRI)	3:53.73
5000 metres	Rajendra Bahadur Bhandari (NEP)	14:01.19	Surendra Kumar Singh (IND)	14:02.43	Nowshad Khan (PAK)	14:28.59
10,000 metres	Surendra Singh (IND)	29:41.30 GR	Regunath Sadasivam (IND)	29:43.09	M. Ajanthan (SRI)	31:01.34
110 metre hurdles	Mafuzur Rahman (BAN)	14.19	Muhanned Sajjad (PAK)	14.26	Abdul Rashid (PAK)	14.62
400 metre hurdles	Allah Ditta (PAK)	51.00	Asoka Jayasundara (SRI)	51.02	Joseph Abraham (IND)	51.66
3000 metre steeplechase	Rajendra Bahadur Bhandari (NEP)	8:51:76	Om Prakash (IND)	9:00:99	Ram Bhadur (IND)	9:02:15
4×100 metre relay	India (IND)	40.29	Pakistan (PAK)	40.76	Afghanistan (AFG)	43.91
4×400 metre relay	Sri Lanka (SRI)	3:09:25	India (IND)	3:10:47	Pakistan (PAK)	3:11:35
Marathon	Ajit Bandara (SRI)	2:25:40	Arjun Kumar Basnet (NEP)	2:28:10	L. Binning (IND)	2:29:16
High jump	Manjula Kumara (SRI)	2:19 m	Benedict Stanley (IND)	2:19 m	Nalin Priyantha (SRI)	2:16 m
Pole vault	Muhammad Ayub (PAK)	4.78 m	Muhammed Zafar (PAK)	4.70 m	Vidivelu (IND)	4.50 m
Long jump	Wayne Pepin (IND)	7.73 m	Prasad Dharmaratne (SRI)	7.46 m	Muhammed Riaz (PAK)	7.31 m
Triple jump	Chaminda Sampath (SRI)	16:26 m GR	Khan Waseem (PAK)	15:85 m	Mathew Binu (IND)	15:82
Shot put	Sourabh Vij (IND)	17.43 m	Kudeep Man (IND)	16.75 m	Asraf Ali (PAK)	16.63 m
Discus throw	Basharat Ali (PAK)	55.10 m	Amrit Pal Singh (IND)	52.89 m	Harpreet Singh (IND)	52.69 m
Javelin throw	Kingsly Gunathilake (SRI)	77.99	Sunil Goswami (IND)	70.20	Muhammad Irfan (PAK)	69.69

=== Women ===
Event	Gold		Silver		Bronze	
100 metres	Susanthika Jayasinghe (SRI)	11.33	Jani Chathurangani Silva (SRI)	11.76	Sadaf Siddiqui (PAK)	12:07
200 metres	Susanthika Jayasinghe (SRI)	22.99	Buddika Sujani (SRI)	24.24	Poonam Tomar (IND)	24.62
400 metres	Pinki Pramanik (IND)	52.54	Menaka Wickramasinghe (SRI)	53.83	Lasanthi Deepika (SRI)	55.76
800 metres	Pinki Pramanik (IND)	2:03.81	Santhi Soundarajan (IND)	2:04.77	Bushra Parveen (PAK)	2:08.04 NR
1500 metres	Santhi Soundarajan (IND)	4:14.26	Sinimoule Paulose (IND)	4:14.71	Shanika Samanmali (SRI)	4:30.61
5000 metres	O. P. Jaisha (IND)	16:03.11	D. A. Inoka (SRI)	16:37.41	Preeja Sreedharan (IND)	16:52.51
10,000 metres	Preeja Sreedharan (IND)	34:27.13 GR	Kanchai Maya Koju (NEP)	35:03.43	Preethi Rao (IND)	35:24.05
100 metre hurdles	Anuradha Biswal (IND)	14.28	Sumita Rani (BAN)	14.36 NR	Poonam Bojanna (IND)	14.61
4×100 metre relay	Sri Lanka (SRI); Susanthika Jayasinghe; Buddika Sujani; Jani Chathurangani; Premila Priyadarshani	44.63 GR	India (IND)	46.37	Pakistan (PAK)	47.28
4×400 metre relay	India (IND)	3:38:01	Sri Lanka (SRI)	3:39:48	Pakistan (PAK)	3:44:81
High jump	Dulanjalee Ranasinghe (SRI)	1.71 m	Tharanga Vinodani (SRI)	1.68 m	Tessymol Joseph (IND)	1.68 m
Long jump	Anju Bobby George (IND)	6.42 m GR	Foujia Huda (BAN)	6.07 m =NR	N.C.D. Priyadarshani (SRI)	5.94 m
Shot put	Saroj Sihag (IND)	14.96 m	Nadeeka Muthunayake (SRI)	14.45 m	Zeenat Parveen (PAK)	14.07 m
Discus throw	Padma Nandani Wijesundara (SRI)	47.50 m	Saroj Sihag (IND)	45.67 m	Priyanka Bhanot (IND)	43.29 m
Javelin throw	Nadeeka Lakmali (SRI)	50.73 m	Anne Maheshi De Silva (SRI)	49.85 m	Gurmeet Kaur (IND)	46.45 m

== Doping in Athletics at the 2006 South Asian Games ==
Name	NOC	Sport	Banned Substance	Stripped Off Medal	Ban Duration	Awarded	Ref.
Rajendra Bahadur Bhandari	Nepal	Athletics (3000m)	Norandrosterone	(gold) Gold	2 Years	(India) Om Prakash	
Rajendra Bahadur Bhandari	Nepal	Athletics (5000m)	Norandrosterone	(gold) Gold	2 Years	(India) Surendra Kumar Singh	
Jani Chathurangani Silva	Sri Lanka	Athletics (100m)	Nandrolone	(silver) Silver	2 Years	(Pakistan) Sadaf Siddiqui	
Jani Chathurangani Silva	Sri Lanka	Athletics (4×100m Relay)	Nandrolone	(gold) Gold	2 Years	India	

=== Updated Medal Summary after Doping test results (Medal Upgrade) ===
Events	Gold	Silver	Bronze	Ref.
5000 metres (Men)	(India) Surendra Kumar Singh	(Pakistan) Nowshad Khan	(India) Sita Ram Jat	
3000 metres Steeplechase	(India) Om Prakash	(India) Ram Bhadur	(Pakistan) Muhammad Nawaz	
100 metres (Women)	(Sri Lanka) Susanthika Jayasinghe	(Pakistan) Sadaf Siddiqui	(India) Poonam Bojanna Berera	
4×100m Relay (Women)	India	Pakistan	Bangladesh	

== Medal table ==
* Host nation (Sri Lanka)

Rank	Nation	Gold	Silver	Bronze	Total
1	India (IND)	18	12	15	45
2	Sri Lanka (SRI)*	13	12	7	32
3	Pakistan (PAK)	3	7	11	21
4	Bangladesh (BAN)	1	2	1	4
5	Nepal (NEP)	0	2	0	2
6	Afghanistan (AFG)	0	0	1	1
7	Bhutan (BHU)	0	0	0	0
7	Maldives (MDV)	0	0	0	0
Totals (8 entries)		35	35	35	105

- Note: Table has been adjusted to discount medals by athletes who failed drugs tests

== See also ==
- Doping at the 2006 South Asian Games
