= Pakistan at the 2019 World Athletics Championships =

Pakistan at the 2019 World Championships in Athletics
- WA code: PAK
- National federation: AFP

in Doha
- Competitors: 1
- Medals: Gold 0 Silver 0 Bronze 0 Total 0

World Championships in Athletics appearances
- 1983; 1987; 1991; 1993; 1995; 1997; 1999; 2001; 2003; 2005; 2007; 2009; 2011; 2013; 2015; 2017; 2019; 2022; 2023

Pakistan competed at the 2019 World Championships in Athletics in Doha, Qatar, from 27 September-6 October 2019, with their sole athlete, Arshad Nadeem, competing in the men's javelin throw event.

== Results ==
Key

- Note–Ranks given for track events are within the athlete's heat only
- Q = Qualified for the next round
- q = Qualified for the next round as a fastest loser or, in field events, by position without achieving the qualifying target
- NR = National record
- PB = Personal best
- N/A = Round not applicable for the event
- Bye = Athlete not required to compete in round

=== Men ===
Field events

Athlete	Event	Qualification		Final	
Athlete	Event	Distance	Position	Distance	Position
Arshad Nadeem	Javelin throw	81.52 NR	16	Did not advance	
