= Pakistan at the 2009 World Championships in Athletics =

- WA code: PAK

in Berlin
- Competitors: 2
- Medals: Gold 0 Silver 0 Bronze 0 Total 0

World Championships in Athletics appearances
- 1983; 1987; 1991; 1993; 1995; 1997; 1999; 2001; 2003; 2005; 2007; 2009; 2011; 2013; 2015; 2017; 2019; 2022; 2023

Pakistan competed at the 2009 World Championships in Athletics from 15–23 August. A team of 2 athletes was announced in preparation for the competition.

== Team selection ==
Track and road events

Event	Athletes	
Event	Men	Women
100 metres	Liaquat Ali	
400 metres		Rozina Shafqat

== Results ==
(q – qualified, NM – no mark, SB – season best)

=== Men ===
Athlete	Event	Heats		Semifinals		Final	
Athlete	Event	Time	Rank	Time	Rank	Time	Rank
Liaquat Ali	100 metres	10.64	61	Did not advance			

=== Women ===
Athlete	Event	Heats		Semifinals		Final	
Athlete	Event	Time	Rank	Time	Rank	Time	Rank
Rozina Shafqat	400 metres	1:00.72	37	Did not advance			
