= 2008 South Asian Athletics Championships =

Athletics competition in Kochi, India

3rd South Asian Athletics Championships
- Venue: Maharaja's College Stadium
- Location: Kochi, India
- Start date: 7 March 2008
- End date: 8 March 2008
- Nations: 7 (Bangladesh, Bhutan, India, Maldives, Nepal, Pakistan, and Sri Lanka)

The 2008 South Asian Athletics Championships was an athletics competition held from 7 to 8 March 2008 at the Maharaja's College Stadium, Kochi, India. This was the third edition of the competition, and the event was organized under the aegis of the South Asian Athletics Federation and hosted by the Athletics Federation of India.

== Medal table ==
* Host nation (India)

Rank	Nation	Gold	Silver	Bronze	Total
1	India*	24	19	13	56
2	Sri Lanka	7	9	15	31
3	Pakistan	3	6	6	15
4	Bangladesh	0	0	0	0
4	Maldives	0	0	0	0
4	Nepal	0	0	0	0
Totals (6 entries)		34	34	34	102

== Results ==
=== Men ===
Event	Gold		Silver		Bronze	
100 m	Bharmappa Nagaraj; India	10.62	Muhammad Imran; Pakistan	10.68	Ranpati Sanjeewa; Sri Lanka	10.71
200 m	Shiwantha Weerasuriya; Sri Lanka	21.44	Ashan Ranasingne Hasaranga; Sri Lanka	21.84	Muhammad Imran; Pakistan	21.91
400 m	Prasanna Amarasekera; Sri Lanka	46.47	Rohitha Pushpakumara; Sri Lanka	46.76	Virender Kumar Pankaj; India	47.70
800 m	Rajeev Ramesan; India	1:48.43 CR	Sajeesh Joseph; India	1:49.14	Suresh Abeynayake; Sri Lanka	1:49.58
1500 m	Hamza Chatholi; India	3:44.67 CR	Ravinder; India	3:44.84	Prabath Kumara Mendis; Sri Lanka	3:46.45
5000 m	Surender Singh; India	14:10.77 CR	Sandeep Batham; India	14:35.06	K.R. Saman Kumara; Sri Lanka	14:46.75
10,000 m	Santhosh Kumar Patel; India	29:41.67 CR	Soji Mathew; India	29:45.86	Ajith Bandara Adikari; Sri Lanka	30:30.53
110 m hurdles	Krishna Mohan; India	14.28	Mohammed Sajjad; Pakistan	14.39	Pandi Muthusamy; India	14.41
400 m hurdles	Patlavath Shankar; India	50.72 CR	Kuldev Singh; India	51.05	Yasasiri Ajith; Sri Lanka	51.49
High jump	Hari Shankar Roy; India	2.15 m CR	Nalin Priyantha; Sri Lanka	2.10 m	Benedict Starli; India	2.10 m
Pole vault	Gajanan Upadhayay; India	4.70 m	Adnan Anjum; Pakistan	4.60 m	K.P. Bimin; India	4.60 m
Long jump	Mahan Singh; India	7.55 m	Pushpender Singh; India	7.52 m	Muhammad Riaz; Pakistan	7.31 m
Triple jump	Zafar Iqbal; Pakistan	16.42 m CR	Amarjeet Singh; India	16.39 m	Bibin Mathew; India	16.12 m
Shot put	Satyender Singh; India	17.71 m CR	Ali Ashraf; Pakistan	17.22 m	Om Prakash Singh; India	17.22 m
Discus throw	Sukhbir Singh; India	52.23 m	Basharat Ali; Pakistan	51.34 m	Simranjeet Singh; India	49.61 m
Hammer throw	Ghulam Shabbir; Pakistan	59.16 m	Madhu Kumar; India	56.26 m	Jitender Singh; India	55.61 m
Javelin throw	Mohammad Imran; Pakistan	72.91 m	Kashinath Naik; India	72.73 m	Muhammad Irfan; Pakistan	68.71 m
4 × 100 m relay	Bharmappa Nagaraj; Ritesh Anand; Vilas Nelgunda; Krishna Kumar Rane; India	40.86	Muhammad Imran; Liaqat Ali; Baig Afzal; Zafar Iqbal; Pakistan	41.11	H.W.S. Perera; Ashan Ranasingne Hasaranga; Umanga Surendra; W.Y.G.T Fernando; Sri Lanka	41.13
4 × 400 m relay	Prasanna Amarasekera; Ashoka Jayasundara; Rohitha Pushpakumara; Chanaka Dulan Priyashantha; Sri Lanka	3:08.93 CR	Virender Kumar Pankaj; Patlavath Shankar; Valliayampoikayil Baby Bineesh; Vinay Chaudhary; India	3:10.44	Nawaz Haq; Mohammed Ehsan; Muhammad Javed; Bilal Ali; Pakistan	3:24.54

=== Women ===
Event	Gold		Silver		Bronze	
100 m	Pramila Priyadarshani; Sri Lanka	11.74	Jani Chathurangani; Sri Lanka	11.87	Hiriyur Manjunath Jyothi; India	12.01
200 m	Pramila Priyadarshani; Sri Lanka	24.04	L.S. Irangani; Sri Lanka	24.25	Sushmita Singha Roy; India	24.40
400 m	Mandeep Kaur; India	53.34	Chitra Soman; India	53.69	Chandrika Subashini; Sri Lanka	54.74
800 m	Sinimole Paulose; India	2:03.16	Sushma Devi; India	2:05.37	Niluka Geethani Rajasekara; Sri Lanka	2:09.74
1500 m	Sinimole Paulose; India	4:16.40 CR	Sushma Devi; India	4:19.82	Dissanayake Samanmali; Sri Lanka	4:25.33
5000 m	Preeja Sreedharan; India	16:08.09	Kavita Raut; India	16:31.22	Dalugoda Inoka; Sri Lanka	17:33.87
100 m hurdles	Anuradha Biswal; India	14.10	Poonam Belliappa; India	14.51	Lakshika Sugandhi; Sri Lanka	14.67
400 m hurdles	Leelavathi Veerappan; India	59.35	Harpreet Singh; India	1:01.11	P.S.M. De Soysa; Sri Lanka	1:01.51
4 × 100 m relay	Jani Chathurangani; Geethani Pathmakumari; Pramila Priyadarshani; L.S. Irangani; Sri Lanka	45.95	Hiriyur Manjunath Jyothi; Anuradha Biswal; Mandeep Kaur; P.K. Priya; India	46.67	Nadia Nazir; Sadaf Siddiqui; Noshee Parveen; Javeria Hassan; Pakistan	47.44
4 × 400 m relay	Chitra Soman; Sathi Geetha; Mandeep Kaur; Manjeet Kaur; India	3:37.04 CR	L.S. Irangani; Chandrika Subashini; Lasanthi Deepika; P.S.M. De Soysa; Sri Lanka	3:37.35	Rozina Shafqat; Nadia Nazir; Sumaira Zahoor; Bushra Parveen; Pakistan	3:55.88

=== Mixed ===
Event	Gold		Silver		Bronze	
4 × 400 m relay	Rashid; Mohammed Ashfaq; Neeru Pathak; Olimba Steffi; India	3:20.13	Kalinga Kumarage; Nadeesha Ramanayake; Kalhara Idupa; Sayuri Mendis; Sri Lanka	3:20.85	Ram Prasad Tharu; Som Bahadur Kumal; R Kumari Tharu; Jayerani Tharu; Nepal	3:37.16
