= Athletics Federation of Pakistan =

Athletic governing body

- ایتھلیٹکس فیڈریشن آف پاکستان
- Sport: Athletics
- Jurisdiction: National
- Abbreviation: AFP
- Founded: 1951
- Affiliation: World Athletics
- Affiliation date: 1951
- Regional affiliation: Asian Athletics
- Headquarters: Islamabad
- Location: Jinnah Stadium, Pakistan Sports Complex
- President: Brigadier (Retd.) Wajahat Hussain
- Secretary: Lt Col Shahjehan Mir (Retd)

Official website
- athleticsfederationofpakistan.org.pk
- (Pakistan)

The Athletics Federation of Pakistan (Urdu: ایتھلیٹکس فیڈریشن آف پاکستان, AFP) is the apex body of athletics in Pakistan. It was formed in 1951. Brigadier (Retd.) Wajahat Hussain is the current president.

== History ==
In 1951, the federation acquired the rights to organize athletics in Pakistan from the IAAF. In 1962, the first elections were held and the body was granted affiliation by the Pakistan Olympic Association. Alvin Robert Cornelius was elected as AFP's first president, while A.U. Zafar was the federation's first secretary.

== Affiliations ==
The body is affiliated with:

- World Athletics
- Asian Athletics
- Pakistan Sports Board
- Pakistan Olympic Association

== National Championship ==
In addition to a regular event at the National Games, AFP organizes National Athletics Championships for men and women in junior, senior, and master categories.

=== National Athletics Championships ===
National Athletics Championships are held annually around the month of April and serve as the national championship for the track and field events in Pakistan. The 50th edition took place in 2021 with 14 teams Pakistan Army, Pakistan Air Force (PAF), Pakistan Navy, Pakistan WAPDA, Pakistan Railways, Higher Education Commission (HEC), Punjab, Sindh, Khyber Pakhtunkhwa, Balochistan, Islamabad, Azad Jammu and Kashmir, FATA and Gilgit Baltistan.

== See also ==
- Sport in Pakistan
- Athletics in Pakistan
- List of Pakistani records in athletics
