= Swimming at the 2006 Asian Games – Men's 50 metre backstroke =

Men's 50 metre backstroke at the 2006 Asian Games
- Venue: Hamad Aquatic Centre
- Date: 7 December 2006
- Competitors: 30 from 23 nations

Medalists
gold medal	Junya Koga	Japan
silver medal	Ouyang Kunpeng	China
bronze medal	Sung Min	South Korea

The men's 50m backstroke swimming event at the 2006 Asian Games was held on December 7, 2006, at the Hamad Aquatic Centre in Doha, Qatar.

== Schedule ==
All times are Arabia Standard Time (UTC+03:00)

Date	Time	Event
Thursday, 7 December 2006	10:00	Heats
Thursday, 7 December 2006	18:00	Final

== Records ==
Prior to this competition, the existing world, Asian and Games records were as follows.

World Record	Thomas Rupprath (GER)	24.80	Barcelona, Spain	27 July 2003
Asian Record	Ouyang Kunpeng (CHN)	25.18	Macau	4 November 2005
Games Record	Junichi Miyashita (JPN)	26.44	Doha, Qatar	5 December 2006

== Results ==
=== Heats ===
Rank	Heat	Athlete	Time	Notes
1	2	Ouyang Kunpeng (CHN)	25.74	GR
2	3	Sung Min (KOR)	25.98	
3	3	Masafumi Yamaguchi (JPN)	26.06	
4	4	Alex Lim (MAS)	26.16	
5	4	Junya Koga (JPN)	26.17	
6	4	Stanislav Ossinskiy (KAZ)	26.86	
7	2	Zhang Bodong (CHN)	27.00	
8	3	Danil Bugakov (UZB)	27.12	
9	3	Lee Seung-hyeon (KOR)	27.22	
10	3	Geoffrey Cheah (HKG)	27.57	
11	4	Gary Tan (SIN)	27.58	
12	2	Lin Yu-an (TPE)	27.78	
13	4	Yuan Ping (TPE)	27.82	
14	2	Sanhawat Charoonsri (THA)	27.87	
15	3	Arjun Muralidharan (IND)	28.15	
16	4	Suriya Suksuphak (THA)	28.29	
16	3	Đỗ Huy Long (VIE)	28.29	
18	2	Philip Yee (HKG)	28.50	
19	1	Heshan Unamboowe (SRI)	28.57	
20	2	Lei Chi Lon (MAC)	28.62	
21	4	Ryan Arabejo (PHI)	28.69	
22	2	Shahin Baradaran (IRI)	28.74	
23	1	Ahmed Salamoun (QAT)	29.04	
24	4	Obaid Al-Jasmi (UAE)	29.10	
25	1	Aiman Al-Kulaibi (OMA)	29.14	
26	3	Zainalabdeen Qali (KUW)	29.36	
27	2	Rubel Rana (BAN)	29.90	
28	1	Cheong Kin Wa (MAC)	30.17	
29	1	Fadi Awesat (PLE)	31.74	
30	1	Lkhagvadorjiin Mönkhtüvshin (MGL)	35.18	

=== Final ===
Rank	Athlete	Time	Notes
1st place, gold medalist(s)	Junya Koga (JPN)	25.40	GR
2nd place, silver medalist(s)	Ouyang Kunpeng (CHN)	25.47	
3rd place, bronze medalist(s)	Sung Min (KOR)	25.57	
4	Masafumi Yamaguchi (JPN)	25.91	
5	Alex Lim (MAS)	26.06	
6	Danil Bugakov (UZB)	26.69	
7	Zhang Bodong (CHN)	26.75	
8	Stanislav Ossinskiy (KAZ)	26.80	
