= Swimming at the 2006 Asian Games – Men's 100 metre backstroke =

Men's 100 metre backstroke at the 2006 Asian Games
- Venue: Hamad Aquatic Centre
- Date: 5 December 2006
- Competitors: 29 from 22 nations

Medalists
gold medal	Junichi Miyashita	Japan
silver medal	Ouyang Kunpeng	China
bronze medal	Masafumi Yamaguchi	Japan

The men's 100m backstroke swimming event at the 2006 Asian Games was held on December 5, 2006 at the Hamad Aquatic Centre in Doha, Qatar.

== Schedule ==
All times are Arabia Standard Time (UTC+03:00)

Date	Time	Event
Tuesday, 5 December 2006	11:00	Heats
Tuesday, 5 December 2006	18:43	Final

== Records ==
Prior to this competition, the existing world, Asian and Games records were as follows.

World Record	Aaron Peirsol (USA)	53.17	Indianapolis, United States	2 April 2005
Asian Record	Tomomi Morita (JPN)	53.85	Tokyo, Japan	21 April 2006
Games Record	Atsushi Nishikori (JPN)	55.06	Busan, South Korea	3 October 2002

== Results ==
Legend

- DNS — Did not start

=== Heats ===
Rank	Heat	Athlete	Time	Notes
1	3	Junichi Miyashita (JPN)	55.95	
2	2	Ouyang Kunpeng (CHN)	56.40	
3	4	Masafumi Yamaguchi (JPN)	56.58	
4	3	Alex Lim (MAS)	57.39	
5	2	Stanislav Ossinskiy (KAZ)	57.58	
6	4	Zhang Bodong (CHN)	57.99	
7	4	Lee Seung-hyeon (KOR)	58.27	
8	3	Gary Tan (SIN)	58.81	
9	3	Geoffrey Cheah (HKG)	58.83	
10	3	Danil Bugakov (UZB)	58.95	
11	2	Yuan Ping (TPE)	59.16	
12	4	Lin Yu-an (TPE)	59.30	
13	4	Oleg Rabota (KAZ)	59.55	
14	2	Đỗ Huy Long (VIE)	1:00.58	
15	2	Shahin Baradaran (IRI)	1:01.14	
16	3	Antonio Tong (MAC)	1:01.29	
17	4	Suriya Suksuphak (THA)	1:01.54	
18	4	Ryan Arabejo (PHI)	1:01.57	
19	3	Arjun Muralidharan (IND)	1:01.64	
20	2	Heshan Unamboowe (SRI)	1:01.91	
21	2	Aiman Al-Kulaibi (OMA)	1:02.05	
22	4	Zainalabdeen Qali (KUW)	1:02.24	
23	1	Ahmed Salamoun (QAT)	1:02.59	
24	2	Chung Kwok Ting (HKG)	1:02.76	
25	1	Lei Chi Lon (MAC)	1:03.00	
26	1	Rubel Rana (BAN)	1:04.43	
27	1	Lkhagvadorjiin Mönkhtüvshin (MGL)	1:15.80	
28	1	Amir Adnan (IRQ)	1:18.10	
—	3	Sergey Pankov (UZB)	DNS	

=== Final ===
Rank	Athlete	Time	Notes
1st place, gold medalist(s)	Junichi Miyashita (JPN)	54.67	GR
2nd place, silver medalist(s)	Ouyang Kunpeng (CHN)	54.92	
3rd place, bronze medalist(s)	Masafumi Yamaguchi (JPN)	55.78	
4	Zhang Bodong (CHN)	56.68	
5	Stanislav Ossinskiy (KAZ)	57.43	
6	Alex Lim (MAS)	57.55	
7	Lee Seung-hyeon (KOR)	58.46	
8	Gary Tan (SIN)	59.08	
