= Kiran Khan =

Pakistani swimmer (born 1989)

Personal information
- Full name: Kiran Khan
- Born: December 21, 1989 (age 36) Lahore, Pakistan
- Height: 1.71 m (5 ft 7 in)
- Weight: 62 kg (137 lb)

Sport
- Sport: Swimming
Medal record
Representing Pakistan
Islamic Solidarity Games
Bronze medal – third place	2017 Baku	4 × 200 m freestyle relay
South Asian Games
Silver medal – second place	2004 Islamabad	200 m freestyle
Silver medal – second place	2004 Islamabad	4×100 m freestyle
Silver medal – second place	2004 Islamabad	4×200 m freestyle
Silver medal – second place	2004 Islamabad	100 m backstroke
Silver medal – second place	2004 Islamabad	200 m backstroke
Silver medal – second place	2004 Islamabad	4×100 m medley
Silver medal – second place	2006 Colombo	50 m backstroke
Silver medal – second place	2006 Colombo	100 m backstroke
Bronze medal – third place	2004 Islamabad	400 m freestyle
Bronze medal – third place	2004 Islamabad	200 m backstroke
Bronze medal – third place	2004 Islamabad	200m Individual Medley
Bronze medal – third place	2006 Colombo	200 m freestyle
Bronze medal – third place	2006 Colombo	400 m freestyle
Bronze medal – third place	2006 Colombo	200 m breaststroke
Bronze medal – third place	2010 Dhaka	50 m backstroke
Bronze medal – third place	2010 Dhaka	50 n butterfly

Kiran Khan (born December 21, 1989) is a Pakistani Olympic swimmer. She first came to national attention at the 28th Pakistan National Games in 2001, where she won 7 gold medals, 3 silver medals and 3 bronze medals.

== See also ==
- Rubab Raza – Pakistan's first female Olympic swimmer (and third overall woman competitor from her country) at the 2004 Olympics.
