= Swimming at the 2006 South Asian Games =

The swimming competition at the 2006 South Asian Games happened between August 19–23, 2006, at the Sugathadasa Stadium Swimming Pool in Colombo, Sri Lanka.

== Medal table ==
* Host nation (Sri Lanka)

Rank	Nation	Gold	Silver	Bronze	Total
1	India	32	18	3	53
2	Sri Lanka*	5	9	10	24
3	Bangladesh	1	6	9	16
4	Pakistan	0	5	15	20
5	Nepal	0	0	1	1
Totals (5 entries)		38	38	38	114

== Results ==
India dominated the competition winning 32 out of a possible 38 gold medals, while hosts Sri Lanka won five gold medals with Bangladesh the only other country to win a gold medal.

=== Men's events ===
Event	Gold		Silver		Bronze	
50 m freestyle	Varun Divgikar; India	23.97	Daniel Lee; Sri Lanka	25.07	Nazrul Islam; Bangladesh	25.41
100 m freestyle	Virdhawal Khade; India	52.71; GR	Daniel Lee; Sri Lanka	55.75	Rezaul; Bangladesh	55.83
200 m freestyle	Virdhawal Khade; India	1:59.07; GR	Amar Muralidharan; India	1:59.23	Heshan Unamboowe; Sri Lanka	2:02.74
400 m freestyle	Rehan Poncha; India	4:05.94	Rohit Havaldar; India	4:05.08	Mehboob Ali; Pakistan	4:25.30
1500 m freestyle	Mandar Divase; India	16:17.58; GR	Rohit Havaldar; India	16:43.59	Mehboob Ali; Pakistan	17:48.31
50 m backstroke	Arjun Muralidharan; India	28.28	Rubel Rana; Bangladesh	28.40	Heshan Unamboowe; Sri Lanka	28.86
100 m backstroke	Andrew Abeysinghe; Sri Lanka	1:00.11; GR	Arjun Muralidharan; India	1:00.50	Sandeep Sejwal; India	1:00.76
200 m backstroke	Andrew Abeysinghe; Sri Lanka	2:07.97	Rehan Poncha; India	2:11.33	Rohit Havaldar; India	2:13.40
50 m breaststroke	Shajahan Ali; Bangladesh	30.43	Sandeep Sejwal; India	30.46	Mohammad Niaz Ali; Bangladesh	31.52
100 m breaststroke	Sandeep Sejwal; India	1:07.73	Shajahan Ali; Bangladesh	1:08.08	Mohammad Niaz Ali; Bangladesh	1:10.34
200 m breaststroke	Arjun Jayaprakash; India	2:27.12	Sandeep Sejwal; India	2:27.43	Mohammad Niaz Ali; Bangladesh	2:34.90
50 m butterfly	Virdhawal Khade; India	25.97	Ahmed Jewel; Bangladesh	26.60	Milinda de Silva; Sri Lanka	26.89
100 m butterfly	Arjun Muralidharan; India	56.67	Ahmed Jewel; Bangladesh	58.89	Nasir Ali; Pakistan	59.37
200 m butterfly	Arjun Muralidharan; India	2:05.06; GR	Rehan Poncha; India	2:07.33	Nasir Ali; Pakistan	2:12.97
200 m individual medley	Rehan Poncha; India	2:11.22; GR	Nisar Ahmed; Pakistan	2:16.26	Rubel Rana; Bangladesh	2:16.62
400 m individual medley	Rehan Poncha; India	4:37.04; GR	Arjun Jayaprakash; India	4:48.84	Nisar Ahmed; Pakistan	4:52.25
4×100 m freestyle relay	Arjun Muralidharan; Virdhawal Khade; Sandeep Sejwal; Rohit Havaldar; India	3:37.41	Rezaul; Kamal Hossain; Nazrul Islam; Rafiq; Bangladesh	3:44.64	Andrew Abeysinghe; Heshan Unamboowe; Milinda de Silva; Daniel Lee; Sri Lanka	3:44.92
4×200 m freestyle relay	Arjun Muralidharan; Virdhawal Khade; Aaron D'Souza; Rohit Havaldar; India	8:07:56	Nisar Ahmed; Firdous Khan; Adil Baig; Mehboob Ali; Pakistan	8:18:82	Nilmin Arsacularatne; Heshan Unamboowe; Milinda de Silva; Daniel Lee; Sri Lanka	8:23:26
4×100 m medley relay	India	4:00.42	Sri Lanka	4:11.67	Nepal	4:53.92

=== Women's events ===
Event	Gold		Silver		Bronze	
50 m freestyle	Lekha Kamath; India	27.70	Mayumi Raheem; Sri Lanka	28.87	Rubab Raza; Pakistan	29.18
100 m freestyle	Lekha Kamath; India	1:00.76	B. Neeraja; India	1:02.17	Mayumi Raheem; Sri Lanka	1:02.85
200 m freestyle	Pooja Alva; India	2:14.65	B. Neeraja; India	2:15.96	Kiran Khan; Pakistan	2:18.67
400 m freestyle	Kishipra Mahajan; India	4:40.72	Pooja Alva; India	4:42.98	Kiran Khan; Pakistan	4:54.56
800 m freestyle	Surabhi Tipri; India	9:39.60	Pooja Alva; India	9:41.93	Imara Fahim; Sri Lanka	10:21.95
50 m backstroke	Fariha Zaman; India	31.70	Kiran Khan; Pakistan	32.25	Rubab Raza; Pakistan	33.41
100 m backstroke	Fariha Zaman; India	1:09.05; GR	Kiran Khan; Pakistan	1:09.76	Kishipra Mahajan; India	1:11.79
200 m backstroke	Fariha Zaman; India	2:31.49; GR	Madhavi Giri; India	2:32.45	Kiran Khan; Pakistan	2:40.49
50 m breaststroke	Mayumi Raheem; Sri Lanka	34.97	Doli Akhter; Bangladesh	36.14	Mahfuza Khatun; Bangladesh	36.87
100 m breaststroke	Mayumi Raheem; Sri Lanka	1:15.84; GR	V. Tejaswani; India	1:18:91	Mahfuza Khatun; Bangladesh	1:20.90
200 m breaststroke	Mayumi Raheem; Sri Lanka	2:45.24; GR	V. Tejaswani; India	2:46.72	Doli Akhter; Bangladesh	2:58.17
50 m butterfly	Lekha Kamath; India	29.71	Sana Wahid; Pakistan	32.87	Miniruwani Samarakoon; Sri Lanka	33.06
100 m butterfly	Lekha Kamath; India	1:04.51; GR	Miniruwani Samarakoon; Sri Lanka	1:11.85	Miniruwani Samarakoon; Pakistan	1:16.29
200 m butterfly	Pooja Alva; India	2:24:82	Madhavi Giri; India	2:26:07	Miniruwani Samarakoon; Sri Lanka	2:40:81
200 m individual medley	V. Tejaswini; India	2:28.78	Mayumi Raheem; Sri Lanka	2:30.98	Rida Sabahat; Pakistan	2:51.18
400 m individual medley	V. Tejaswini; India	5:16.21	Madhavi Giri; India	5:21.72	Mayumi Raheem; Sri Lanka	5:26.21
4×100 m freestyle relay	India	4:08.72	Sri Lanka	4:25.20	Pakistan	4:35.08
4×200 m freestyle relay	India	9:18.76	Sri Lanka	9:38.41	Pakistan	9:53.40
4×100 m medley relay	India	4:40.42	Sri Lanka	4:49.12	Pakistan	4:57.99
