= Swimming at the 2010 South Asian Games =

The swimming competition at the 2010 South Asian Games held in Dhaka, Bangladesh.

== Results ==
=== Men's events ===
Event	Gold		Silver		Bronze	
50 m freestyle	(India) Virdhawal Vikram Khade	23.73	(India) Aaron Agnel D'souza	24.42	(Bangladesh) Mohammad Mahfizur Rahman	24.53
100 m freestyle	(India) Aaron Agnel D'souza	52.48	(Bangladesh) Mohammad Mahfizur Rahman	52.85	(Sri Lanka) Heshan Bandara Unamboowe	54.23
400 m freestyle	(India) Adaveeshiah Puttaveeraswamy Gagan Ullalmath	4:04.85	(India) Mandar Divase	4:07.41	(Pakistan) Israr Hussain	4:25.85
50 m backstroke	(India) Balakrishnan Melkote Badarinath	27.63	(Sri Lanka) Heshan Bandara Unamboowe	27.93	(India) Rohit Tajendra Havaldar	28.35
100 m backstroke	(Sri Lanka) Heshan Bandara Unamboowe	58.98	(India) Balakrishnan Melkote Badarinath	59.08	(Bangladesh) Mohammad Rubel Rana	1:02.65
50 m breaststroke	(India) Arjun Jaya Prakash	30.04	(Bangladesh) Mohammad Shahajahan Ali Rony	31.04	(Bangladesh) Mohammad Kamal Hossain	31.05
100 m breaststroke	(India) Sandeep Sejwal	1:05.01	(India) Puneet Rana	1:06.74	(Bangladesh) Mohammad Kamal Hossain	1:07.32
200 m breaststroke	(India) Sandeep Sejwal	2:21.03	(Bangladesh) Mohammad Kamal Hossain	2:27.54	(India) Anoop Augustine	2:29.99
50 m butterfly	(India) Virdhawal Vikram Khade	25.54	(India) Arjun Muralidharan	26.15	(Bangladesh) Mohammad Anik Islam	26.61
100 m butterfly	(India) Arjun Muralidharan	56.86	(Sri Lanka) Conrad Anthony Francis	58.44	(Bangladesh) Mohammad Jewel Ahmad	58.90
200 m individual medley	(India) Rehan Jehangir Poncha	2:12.65	(Sri Lanka) Heshan Bandara Unamboowe	2:13.08	(Bangladesh) Mohammad Rubel Rana	2:19.03
4×100 m medley relay	India	3:58.76	Bangladesh	4:00.39	Sri Lanka	4:07.04

=== Women's events ===
Event	Gold		Silver		Bronze	
50 m freestyle	(India) Shubha Chittaranjan	27.98	(India) Sneha Thirugnana Sambandam	28.67	(Sri Lanka) Madhawee Kaushalya Kalurachchilage Don	29.78
50 m backstroke	(India) Fariha Zaman	33.00	(Sri Lanka) Walakanda Kankanamge Gihara Sachini Amaradinghe	34.56	(Pakistan) Kiran Khan	34.89
50 m breaststroke	(Sri Lanka) Minekasashmini Natasha Karunarathe	35.12	(Bangladesh) Mahfuza Khatun	35.43	(Bangladesh) Doli Akhter	36.59
100 m breaststroke	(Sri Lanka) Minekasashmini Natasha Karunarathe		(Bangladesh) Mahfuza Khatun		(Bangladesh) Doli Akhter	
50 m butterfly	(India) Shubha Chittaranjan	29.44	(Sri Lanka) Miniruwani Shashiprabha Samarakoon	32.12	(Pakistan) Kiran Khan	32.18
100 m butterfly	(India) Richa Mishra	1:05.74	(India) Vandita Dhariyal	1:08.40	(Sri Lanka) Miniruwani Shashiprabha Samarakoon	1:10.38
4×100 m medley relay	India	4:41.45	Sri Lanka	4:52.24	Bangladesh	4:55.94
