= Rehan Poncha =

Indian swimmer

Personal information
- Full name: Rehan Jahangir Poncha
- National team: India
- Born: 3 August 1986 (age 39) Karnataka, India
- Height: 1.80 m (5 ft 11 in)
- Weight: 68 kg (150 lb)

Sport
- Sport: Swimming
- Strokes: Freestyle, backstroke, butterfly, individual medley
- College team: Jain University
Medal record
Men's swimming
Representing India
Asian Championships
Bronze medal – third place	2009 Foshan	4×100 m medley relay
South Asian Games
Gold medal – first place	2004 Islamabad	200 m butterfly
Gold medal – first place	2004 Islamabad	200 m individual medley
Gold medal – first place	2004 Islamabad	400 m individual medley
Gold medal – first place	2006 Colombo	400 m freestyle
Gold medal – first place	2006 Colombo	200 m individual medley
Gold medal – first place	2006 Colombo	400 m individual medley
Gold medal – first place	2010 Dhaka	200 m individual medley
Silver medal – second place	2006 Colombo	200 m backstroke
Silver medal – second place	2006 Colombo	200 m butterfly

Rehan Jahangir Poncha (born 3 August 1986) is an Indian former swimmer, Olympian, Arjuna Award winner and a six-time national champion, who specialized in backstroke, butterfly, and individual medley events. He is also the recipient of the Eklavya Award from the Karnataka Olympic Association. He is a 6-time Indian swimming champion, and a 6-time record holder in the butterfly (both 100 and 200 m). Poncha also set two of his records in the freestyle and medley relays at the 2009 Asian Swimming Championships in Foshan, China, along with his teammates Sandeep Sejwal, Virdhawal Khade, and Aaron D'Souza.

Poncha qualified for the men's 200 m butterfly at the 2008 Summer Olympics in Beijing, by clearing a FINA B-standard entry time of 2:01.40 from the Telstra Grand Prix in Sydney, Australia. He edged out Peru's Emmanuel Crescimbeni to take a second spot in heat 1 by 0.24 of a second in 2:01.89. Poncha failed to advance into the semifinals, as he placed fortieth overall in the preliminaries. He has agreed to be a mentor for Indian Collegiate Athletic Program to support the future athletes and guide them to excel in swimming. He started his own academy known as swim smart with Rehan Poncha

Rehan completed his education in Jain University located in Bangalore.
