= Doli Akhter =

Bangladeshi swimmer (born 1986)

Personal information
- Nationality: Bangladesh
- Born: 15 January 1986 (age 40)
- Height: 1.58 m (5 ft 2 in)

Sport
- Sport: Swimming
Medal record
Women's swimming
Representing Bangladesh
South Asian Games
Silver medal – second place	2006 Colombo	50 m breaststroke
Bronze medal – third place	1999 Kathmandu	100 m breaststroke
Bronze medal – third place	2004 Islamabad	100 m breaststroke
Bronze medal – third place	2004 Islamabad	200 m breaststroke
Bronze medal – third place	2006 Colombo	200 m breaststroke
Bronze medal – third place	2010 Dhaka	50 m breaststroke
Bronze medal – third place	2010 Dhaka	100 m breaststroke

Doli Akhter (born 15 January 1986) is an Olympic swimmer from Bangladesh.

She has swum for Bangladesh at the 2000, 2004 and 2008 Olympics. On all three occasions, she attended thanks to a wild card qualification.

She competed in the 100m breaststroke in Sydney (2000), where she was disqualified. In Athens (2004), she competed in the 50m freestyle. She won her heat with a time of 30.72, which was not sufficient for her to advance to the next round.

Akhter won a silver medal in the 200m breaststroke event at the South Asian Games in Islamabad in 2004.

She is Bangladesh's sole athlete at the 2009 World Championships (July 2009).
