= Jain Heritage School =

Private school in Bangalore, India

Jain Heritage School - JHS

Location
- Anjaneya Temple Street, Kempapura, Hebbal; Bangalore, Karnataka, 560024; India; 13.0487°N 77.6016°E

Information
- Type: Private
- Established: 2005
- Chairman: Dr.Chenraj Roychand
- Classes offered: CBSE, IGCSE
- Nickname: JHS
- Website: www.jhs.ac.in

Jain Heritage School (JHS), is a co-educational, day boarding school with a day care centre started by the The JGI Group. The school is located in Hebbal, on the Bangalore - Hyderabad National Highway (NH 7) behind Columbia Asia Hospital Bangalore. The Whitefield campus is one of the Indian schools adopting elements from the Finnish education model.

== Curriculum ==
Jain Heritage School offers Central Board of Secondary Education, New Delhi from Grade I - Grade XII and Cambridge International Examinations CIE which includes International General Certificate of Secondary Education IGCSE curriculum from Grade VII-Grade IX.

== Incidents ==
In July 2021, parents of students protested at the school's campus over the school's fee structure and due to the denial in access to online classes for around 200 students over unpaid fees. The school management denied the allegations. They said that students had access to online classes and the fee structure issue has been discussed with the parents.

In May 2024, Jain Heritage School was among the several schools in Bengaluru that received a bomb-threat email. Police and bomb-disposal personnel searched the premises but found no explosives. The threat was subsequently determined to be a hoax.

== Schkola App ==
In January 2016, Jain Heritage School announced the launch of a mobile application called Schkola for communication between the school and parents. The app provided school notices, examination schedules, event information and attendance alerts. It also allowed parents to communicate with the school. It was designed for Android, Windows and iOS devices.
