= Rohit Havaldar =

Indian swimmer

Personal information
- Full name: Rohit Havaldar
- National team: India
- Born: 26 August 1989 (age 37) Kolhapur, Maharashtra, India
- Height: 1.80 m (5 ft 11 in)
- Weight: 74 kg (163 lb)

Sport
- Sport: Swimming
- Strokes: Backstroke, freestyle
- Club: Dolphin swim club, Bangalore
- College team: Jain University, Bangalore
- Coach: Nihar Ameen
Medal record
Men's swimming
Representing India
South Asian Games
Gold medal – first place	2006 Colombo	4×100 m freestyle relay
Gold medal – first place	2006 Colombo	4×200 m freestyle relay
Silver medal – second place	2006 Colombo	400 m freestyle
Silver medal – second place	2006 Colombo	1500 m freestyle
Bronze medal – third place	2006 Colombo	200 m backstroke
Bronze medal – third place	2010 Dhaka	50 m backstroke

Rohit Rajendra Havaldar (born in Kolhapur, Maharashtra, India) is an Indian swimmer. Rohit Havaldar has achieved many swimming records and has won many medals both at the nationals and state competitions. He competed in Telstra grand prix Olympic trials in July. He created history in 2010 when he won a medal for India in swimming at the South Asian games 2010.

Rohit was awarded Maharashtra government's most prestigious "Shiv Chhatrapati Award" in 2015 by the then Chief Minister, Devendra Fadnavis and Sports Minister, Vinod Tawde.

He was also awarded Karnataka government's most prestigious "Ekalavya Award" in 2006 by the then Governor of Karnataka, Late. Hansraj Bharadwaj and Sports Minister Shri. Gulihatty Shekhar.

== Early life ==
Havaldar was born in Kolhapur in Maharashtra, India to Rajendra Havaldar (father) and Anuradha Havaldar (mother). He received his education at Jain University, Bangalore. At a very young age, he has shown the signs of fulfilling his energy.
