= Sandeep Sejwal =

Indian swimmer

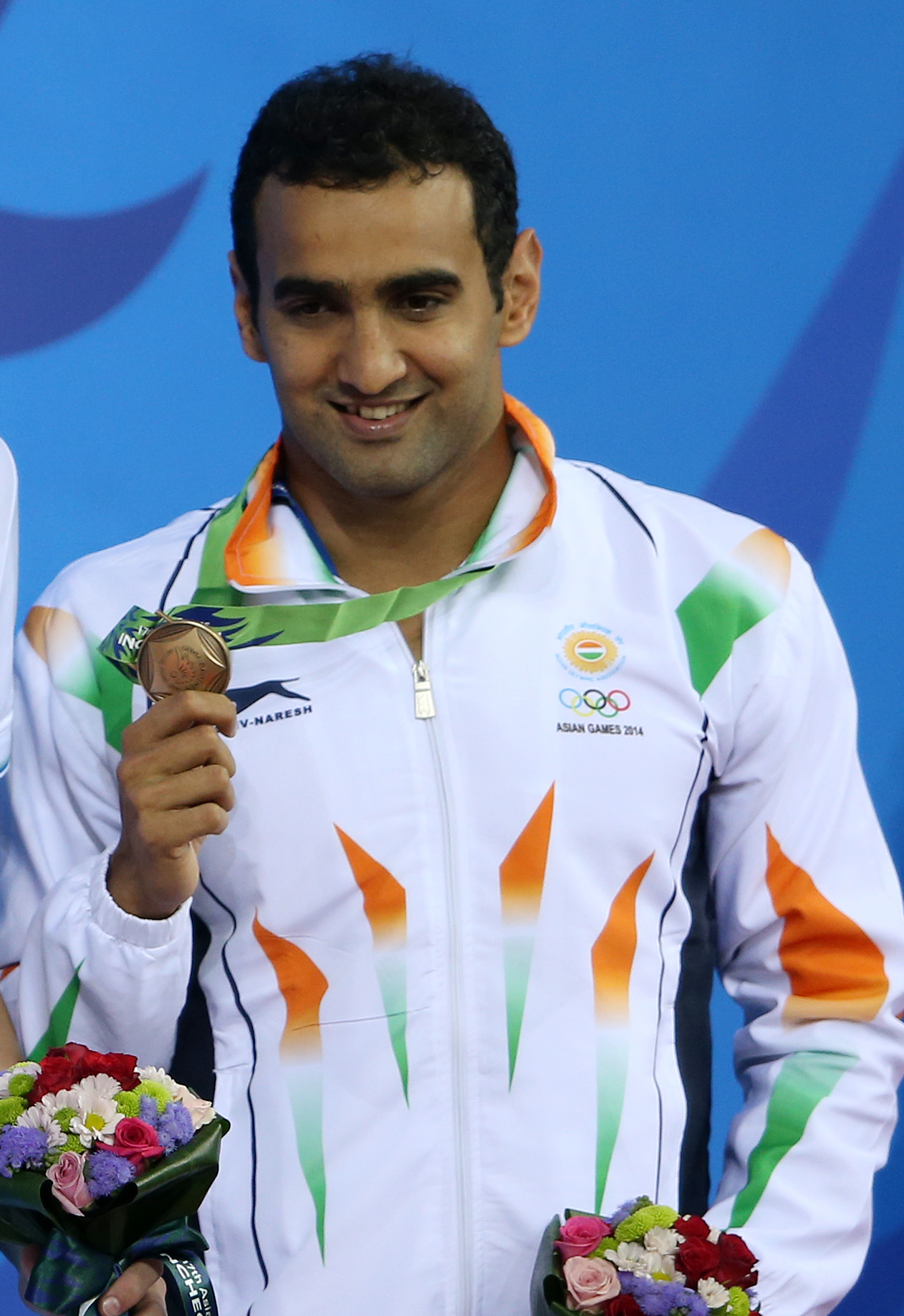

Personal information
- National team: India
- Born: 23 January 1989 (age 37) Delhi, India
- Height: 6 ft 0 in (1.83 m)
- Weight: 160 lb (73 kg)
- Spouse: Pooja Banerjee (m. 2017)

Sport
- Sport: Swimming
- Strokes: Breaststroke, backstroke, freestyle
Medal record
Men's swimming
Representing India
Asian Games
Bronze medal – third place	2014 Incheon	50 m breaststroke
South Asian Games
Gold medal – first place	2006 Colombo	100 m breaststroke
Gold medal – first place	2006 Colombo	4×100 m freestyle relay
Gold medal – first place	2010 Dhaka	100 m breaststroke
Gold medal – first place	2010 Dhaka	200 m breaststroke
Gold medal – first place	2016 Guwahati	50 m breaststroke
Gold medal – first place	2016 Guwahati	100 m breaststroke
Gold medal – first place	2016 Guwahati	200 m breaststroke
Silver medal – second place	2006 Colombo	50 m breaststroke
Silver medal – second place	2006 Colombo	200 m breaststroke
Bronze medal – third place	2006 Colombo	100 m backstroke

Sandeep Sejwal (born 23 January 1989) is an Indian swimmer who has participated in Olympics 2008. He contested in the men's 100 m and 200 m breaststroke events at the 2010 Asian Juniors in Beijing, but did not reach the finals in both events. He won the bronze medal in 2014 Asian Games in 50 m breaststroke.

== Early life ==
Sandeep is an undergraduate student at St. Stephen's College, Delhi.

== Career ==
Sandeep is the Senior National Champion and Indian National Record-holder in the 50 m, 100 m and 200 m Breaststroke events. He won silver medals at the Asian Indoor Games, 2007 in the 50 m and 100 m Breaststroke events.

Sandeep won bronze medal in 50m breaststroke event at the 2014 Asian Games.

He won two gold medals in the 100m, and 200m breaststroke at the 2010 South Asian Games.

He won three gold medals in the 50m,100m, and 200m breaststroke at the 2016 South Asian Games.

He won gold medal with a new national record in 50m breaststroke at the 14th Singapore National Swimming Championships, 2018.

He finished 7th in the finals of 50m breaststroke at the 2018 Asian Games.

He is coached by Nihar Ameen in Bangalore. He is supported by the GoSports Foundation, a sports non profit organisation that aims to promote sporting excellence in India.

== Television ==
Year	Title	Role	Channel
2019	Nach Baliye 9	Contestant	Star Plus

== Awards ==
Sandeep was awarded the Arjuna award by government of India by then president Pranab Mukherjee.

== Personal life ==
Sejwal married TV actress Pooja Banerjee on 28 February 2017. The couple had their first child, a baby girl named Sana on 12 March 2022. and a baby boy on 7 June 2025.
