= Muralidharan (surname) =

Muralidharan or Muralitharan is a surname. Notable people with the surname include:

== Muralidharan ==
- Karthik Muralidharan (born 1975), Indian economist
- Karthika Muralidharan, Indian actress
- Meera Muralidharan, Indian television actress
- Arjun Muralidharan, Indian swimmer
- Amar Muralidharan, Indian swimmer
- V. M. Muralidharan, Former Chairman of Ethiraj College for Women
- Sachin Sudhakaran and Hariharan Muralidharan, Indian sound designer duo
- Nagai Muralidharan
- K. Muralidharan Pillai, Singaporean politician and lawyer

== Muralitharan ==
- Muttiah Muralitharan (born 1972), Sri Lankan cricketer
- Thinaah Muralitharan, Malaysian doubles badminton player
- Vinayagamoorthi Muralitharan (born 1966), Sri Lankan politician, former LTTE terrorist
