= Gagan Ullalmath =

Indian swimmer

Personal information
- Full name: Adaveeshaiah Puttaveeraswamy Gagan Ullalmath
- National team: India
- Born: 8 January 1992 (age 34) Bangalore, India

Sport
- Sport: Swimming
- Strokes: Freestyle
- Club: BSRC Mathikere, Bangalore
- College team: Jain University, Bangalore
- Coach: Pradeep Kumar
Medal record
Men's swimming
Representing India
South Asian Games
Gold medal – first place	2010 Dhaka	400 m freestyle

Adaveeshaiah Puttaveeraswamy Gagan Ullalmath (Kannada: ಗಗನ್ ಉಳ್ಳಾಲಮಠ, born 8 January 1992), popularly known as Gagan Ullalmath, is an Indian swimmer. He was the only swimmer to represent India in the 2012 London Olympics. He finished 7th in heat 1 of 1500 m freestyle event with a time of 16:31:14 and was eventually knocked out at last position 31st.

Ullalmath was given a position to swim in the Olympics due to a universality quota, despite not reaching a qualifying standard.

== See also ==
- Indian swimmers at London 2012
