= JGI =

JGI can refer to:

- The JGI Group
- Jane Goodall Institute
- Joint Genome Institute
