= Israr Hussain =

Pakistani swimmer

Personal information
- Born: 1986 (age 39–40) Rawalpindi, Pakistan

Sport
- Sport: Swimming
Medal record
Representing Pakistan
South Asian Games
Bronze medal – third place	2010 Dhaka	400m freestyle

Israr Hussain (born 1986) is a Pakistani swimmer. He participated in his first Olympics at the 2012 Summer Olympics.

== Career ==
=== 2012 ===
Hussain participated on a wild card in 100m freestyle at the London Olympic Games. Unfortunately he did not qualify from the heats.

=== 2014 ===
He competed at the 2014 Commonwealth Games, in the 100, 200 and 400 m freestyle events.
