= Mahfuza Khatun =

Bangladeshi swimmer

Personal information
- Native name: মাহফুজা খাতুন শীলা
- Full name: Mahfuza Khatun
- Nickname: Shila
- National team: Bangladesh
- Born: 1990 (age 35–36) Jessore District, Bangladesh.

Sport
- Sport: Swimming
- Strokes: Freestyle breaststroke
- College team: University of Chittagong
- Coach: Park Tea Gun
Medal record
Women's swimming
Representing Bangladesh
South Asian Games
Gold medal – first place	2016 Guwahati/Shillong	100 m
Gold medal – first place	2016 Guwahati/Shillong	50 m
Silver medal – second place	2010 Dhaka	100 m
Silver medal – second place	2010 Dhaka	50 m
Bronze medal – third place	2006 Colombo	50 m breaststroke
Bronze medal – third place	2006 Colombo	100 m breaststroke

Mahfuza Khatun is a Bangladeshi swimmer. She won two gold medals in the 50 m & 100 m breaststroke swimming at the 2016 South Asian Games at Guwahati.

== Early life ==
Mahfuza Khatun was born into a poor family from Panchkabor village in Abhaynagar upazila, Jessore District. Her father's name is Ali Ahammad Gazi and mother's name is Karimon Nesa. She has four siblings.

She started competitive swimming in 1999 through a Shisu Academy swimming competition. She won her first medal in her 3rd grade. She won the first gold medal in 100-metre breaststroke in national age group swimming in Dhaka in 2002.

She was a student of Bangladesh Krira Shikkha Protishtan; national sports institute in the year of 2002. Then she did her graduation and post-graduation in Communication and Journalism at University of Chittagong in 2016. Initially she joined Ansar-VDP services team in 2010 but left in 2013 for Bangladesh Navy.

== Career ==
Mahfuza Khatun's favorite events are 100 and 50 meter breaststroke. She got her first SA games medal in Colombo 2006 in 100 m breaststroke. She won two bronze medals in 100 and 50 meter breaststroke swimming in that games.

Again in 2010 South Asian Games, she earned two silver medals in 100 and 50 meter breaststroke swimming. Gradually improving herself, Mahfuza won the 100 and 50 meter breaststroke gold in 2016 SA Games. In 50 meters, she broke the SA Games record with the timing of 34.88 seconds in 2016.

She represented Bangladesh in 2010 Commonwealth Games in Delhi, 2010 FINA World Swimming Championships (25 m) in Dubai, 2013 World Aquatics Championships in Barcelona, 2014 Commonwealth Games in Glasgow.

== Personal life ==
Khatun married another swimmer Shajahan Ali on 18 March 2016. They were dating for quite some time. Ali proposed to her in front of Tajmahal when they were at 2010 Commonwealth games in Delhi. Khatun and Ali have known each other from BKSP days since 2002.

== Honours and achievements ==
Awards

- Sportsperson of the year award for 2016 awarded by Bangladesh Sports Press Association.

== See also ==
- List of swimmers
- World record progression 50 metres breaststroke
- World record progression 100 metres breaststroke
