= Niranjan Mukundan =

Indian para-swimmer (born 1994)

Personal information
- Born: 4 September 1994 (age 32) Bangalore, Karnataka
- Education: Jain University, Bangalore

Sport
- Country: India
- Sport: Para swimming
- Events: Butterfly, Freestyle
- Coached by: John Christopher, Miguel Lopez Alvarado
Medal record
Men's para-swimming
Representing India
Asian Para Games
Bronze medal – third place	2026 Aichi-Nagoya	200 m individual medley SM7

Niranjan Mukundan (born 4 September 1994) is an Indian Para swimmer. He was crowned the champion of the IWAS Junior World Games in 2015.

== Early years ==
Niranjan was born in Bangalore, India with spina bifida; he has an incomplete development of the spinal cord and clubbed feet. With the support of his parents, he started learning swimming and progressed very quickly.

Later, Niranjan attended the Jain University in Bangalore.

== Career ==
=== Early career ===
Niranjan claimed the silver medal twice in 50m butterfly at the Paralympic nationals in Mumbai, 2004–2005 and Kolkata, 2005–2006. At the state aquatic championships in Bangalore he won silver medal in 2007 and bronze in 2009 in water polo.

=== Later career ===
2012 was a fruitful year for Niranjan, at the national swimming championship in Chennai, he won three gold medals, one silver in swimming and one bronze in water polo. Niranjan won his first international medal, a bronze in 200m freestyle at the IDM German Swimming Championship in Berlin.

In 2013 he won more international medals at the IWAS World Junior Games in Puerto Rico, clinching two silver in 100m freestyle and butterfly along with two bronze medals in 100m backstroke and 50m freestyle. He soon became world number 17. At the 13th para national swimming championship in Bangalore, he won one gold, a silver and two bronze medals.

At the 2014 IWAS World Junior Games in Stoke Mandeville, U.K. Niranjan won a whopping eight medals, three gold, two silver and three bronze.

On 1 November 2015, he won the state's prestigious Kannada Rajyotsava Prashasti. He also received the National Award (best sportsman with disability) for his exceptional achievement in the field of sports, at Vigyan Bhavan, Delhi. He won 10 medals (7 gold and 3 silver) in the World Junior Games held at Stadskanaal, Netherlands and was also crowned as the Junior World Champion.

At the 2016 IWAS Junior World Games in Prague, Czech Republic, Niranjan won eight more medals, also three gold, two silver and three bronze. He was honoured to have delivered the athletes' oath in front of his fellow competitors.

== Personal life ==
Niranjan hails from a middle-class family from Bangalore. His father used to work as independent consultant and mother works in the corporate industry. Due to his birth condition, he underwent as many as sixteen surgeries, and was advised by his doctors to undergo swimming to strengthen his leg muscles. His mother first took him to the swimming club in Jayanagar, Bangalore, where he met his coach, John Christopher.

== Awards and recognition ==
- 2016 – Ekalavya Award
- 2015 – National Award for Best Sports-person of the Year by Government of India
- 2015 – Achiever's Award from Dr. Chenraj Roychand, founding chairman, The JGI Group
