= Vandita Dhariyal =

Indian butterfly stroke swimmer

Personal information
- National team: India
- Born: Ahmedabad, Gujarat. India

Sport
- Sport: Swimming
- Strokes: Butterfly
Medal record
Women's swimming
Representing India
South Asian Games
Silver medal – second place	2010 Dhaka	100 m butterfly

Vandita Dhariyal is an Indian butterfly stroke swimmer.

== Career ==
Vandita had participated in various swimming competitions in the 2009 World Aquatics Championships as well as in short course swimming at the 2009 Asian Indoor Games. She won the silver in the 100 metre butterfly swimming at the 2010 South Asian Games.

In 2017, she became the first woman from Gujarat state to swim the English Channel.

== Personal life ==
She is from Ahmedabad, Gujarat. She was coached by Kamlesh Nanavati. She graduated from the Lady Shri Ram College for Women, Delhi. She is pursuing Psychology Major from the London School of Economics.
