= Swimming at the 2004 South Asian Games =

The swimming competition at the 2004 South Asian Games was held in Islamabad, Pakistan.

== Results ==
=== Men's events ===
Event	Gold		Silver		Bronze	
50 m freestyle	(India) Thankappannair Ambikadevi Sujith	24.54	(India) Varun Divgikar	24.82	(Bangladesh) Kazi Monirul Islam	25.06
100 m freestyle	(India) Thankappannair Ambikadevi Sujith	53.53	(India) Rahul Batra	54.67	(Sri Lanka) Arun Karunaratne	55.23
200 m freestyle	(India) Amar Muralidharan	1:59.46	(Pakistan) Mehboob Ali	2:02.37	(Sri Lanka) Arun Karunaratne	2:04.19
400 m freestyle	(India) Mandar Divase	4:14.11	(Pakistan) Mumtaz Ahmed	4:21.84	(Pakistan) Mehboob Ali	4:24.42
1500 m freestyle	(India) Mandar Divase	16:30.83	(Pakistan) Mumtaz Ahmed	17:37.32	(Pakistan) Mehboob Ali	17:55.93
50 m backstroke	(India) Arun Venkatram	28.59	(India) Dipesh Bairagi	29.29	(Sri Lanka) Pradeep Kumara Perera	29.43
100 m backstroke	(Bangladesh) Karar Samedul Islam	1:02.78	(India) Dipesh Bairagi	1:03.43	(Pakistan) Imdad Ali	1:04.82
200 m backstroke	(India) Akbar Ali Mir	2:14.26	(Sri Lanka) Arun Karunaratne	2:21.99	(Pakistan) Imdad Ali	2:22.11
50 m breaststroke	(India) Puneet Rana	31.00	(Sri Lanka) Conrad Anthony Francis	31.35	(Bangladesh) Karar Samedul Islam	31.55
100 m breaststroke	(India) Puneet Rana	1:07.93	(Sri Lanka) Conrad Anthony Francis	1:08.63	(India) Gairik Bardhan	1:08.64
200 m breaststroke	(India) Gairik Bardhan	2:28.95	(Bangladesh) Mohammad Niaz Ali	2:32.36	(Bangladesh) Karar Samedul Islam	2:38.37
50 m butterfly	(Sri Lanka) Conrad Anthony Francis	26.11	(India) Rahul Batra	26.14	(Bangladesh) Mohammed Jewel Ahmed	26.19
100 m butterfly	(Sri Lanka) Conrad Anthony Francis	56.35	(Bangladesh) Mohammed Jewel Ahmed	57.90	(India) Akbar Ali Mir	59.01
200 m butterfly	(India) Rehan Poncha	2:07.10	(Pakistan) Zulfiqar Ali	2:13.26	(Pakistan) Ali Gul	2:16.02
200 m individual medley	(India) Rehan Poncha	2:15.37	(Bangladesh) Mohammad Rubel Rana	2:17.57	(Pakistan) Zulfiqar Ali	2:18.47
400 m individual medley	(India) Rehan Poncha	4:45.27	(Pakistan) Zulfiqar Ali	4:56.99	(Pakistan) Nisar Ahmed	5:04.55
4×100 m freestyle relay	India	3:39.40	Bangladesh	3:44.84	Sri Lanka	3:46.08
4×200 m freestyle relay	India	8:05.76	Pakistan	8:22.43	Bangladesh	8:29.55
4×100 m medley relay	India	4:03.85	Bangladesh	4:05.29	Sri Lanka	4:10.61

=== Women's events ===
Event	Gold		Silver		Bronze	
50 m freestyle	(India) Reshma Millet	28.47	(Sri Lanka) Menaka de Silva	28.49	(Sri Lanka) Chathuri Abeyakoon	29.48
100 m freestyle	(India) Reshma Millet	1:02.54	(Sri Lanka) Chathuri Abeyakoon	1:05.05	(Pakistan) Kiran Khan	1:06.60
200 m freestyle	(India) Reshma Millet	2:15.68	(Pakistan) Kiran Khan	2:21.79	(Pakistan) Sana Abdul Wahid	2:27.55
400 m freestyle	(India) Sivaranjani Vidyanathan	4:36.08	(Pakistan) Mahira Karim	5:14.70	(Pakistan) Ayesha Tajwar	5:17.76
800 m freestyle	(India) Richa Mishra	9:31.96	(India) Sivaranjani Vidyanathan	9:33.92	(Pakistan) Ayesha Tajwar	11:00.76
100 m backstroke	(India) Sumi Cyriac	1:10.16	(Pakistan) Kiran Khan	1:12.88	(Pakistan) Rubab Raza	1:14.81
200 m backstroke	(India) Sumi Cyriac	2:33.54	(Pakistan) Kiran Khan	2:40.34	(Sri Lanka) Dilini Hasanthi Liyanage	2:48.01
100 m breaststroke	(India) Bhavna Sharma	1:20.94	(India) Mrudula Dhanraj	1:21.64	(Bangladesh) Doli Akhter	1:22.65
200 m breaststroke	(India) Sivaranjani Vidyanathan	2:51.24	(India) Bhavna Sharma	2:53.70	(Bangladesh) Doli Akhter	3:01.04
100 m butterfly	(India) Richa Mishra	1:05.82	(India) Sivaranjani Vidyanathan	1:09.93	(Pakistan) Sana Abdul Wahid	1:12.85
200 m butterfly	(India) Richa Mishra	2:23.65	(India) Sivaranjani Vidyanathan	2:41.32	(Sri Lanka) Miniruwani Sashiprabha Samarakoon	2:44.65
200 m individual medley	(India) Richa Mishra	2:29.01	(India) Sivaranjani Vidyanathan	2:34.30	(Pakistan) Kiran Khan	2:39.48
4×100 m freestyle relay	India	4:19.00	Pakistan	4:30.57	Sri Lanka	4:33.50
4×200 m freestyle relay	India	9:12.68	Pakistan	10:04.25	Sri Lanka	10:26.39
4×100 m medley relay	India	4:47.48	Sri Lanka	5:02.96	Pakistan	5:07.09
