= Rezaul =

Rezaul is a given name. Notable people with this name include:

- Rezaul Karim Bablu (born 1962), Bangladeshi politician, Jatiya Sangsad member
- Rezaul Haque Chowdhury, Bangladesh Awami League politician, Member of Parliament
- Rezaul Karim Chowdhury (born 1953), Bangladeshi politician, mayor of Chittagong City Corporation
- Rezaul Bari Dina (1951–2014), Bangladesh Nationalist Party politician, former Member of Parliament
- Md. Rezaul Haque, judge of the High Court Division of Bangladesh Supreme Court
- Rezaul Haque (born 1982), Bangladeshi first-class cricketer
- Md. Rezaul Hasan (born 1962), judge of the High Court Division of the Bangladesh Supreme Court
- Rezaul Karim Hira (born 1942), Bangladesh Awami League politician, Jatiya Sangsad member
- Mullah Rezaul Islam, politician, former Member of Parliament
- Rezaul Karim (diplomat) (1935–2005), Bangladeshi diplomat, philanthropist and writer
- Rezaul Karim (scholar) (born 1971), aka Charmonai Pir, Bangladeshi Deobandi Islamic scholar, politician, social reformer
- SM Rezaul Karim, Bangladesh Awami League politician, Jatiya Sangsad member,
- Rezaul Alam Khandaker, Bangladesh Nationalist Party politician, former Member of Parliament
- Rezaul Karim Mannan, Bangladesh Nationalist Party politician, former three-time Member of Parliament
- A K M Rezaul Mazid, major general in the Bangladesh Army
- Rezaul Karim Rehan (born 1968), retired Bangladeshi footballer
- Rezaul Karim Reza, Bangladeshi professional footballer
- Rezaul Haque Sarkar, Bangladesh Nationalist Party politician, former Member of Parliament
- A. K. M. Rezaul Karim Tansen (born 1953), Bangladeshi politician, Jatiya Sangsad member

== See also ==
- Murder of A. F. M. Rezaul Karim Siddique (1955–2016), professor of English at Rajshahi University, Bangladesh
- Rahzel
- Raizal
- Rasel (disambiguation)
- Rasol (disambiguation)
- Rasul (disambiguation)
- Raziel
