= Daniel Lee (swimmer) =

Sri Lankan swimmer

Personal information
- Nationality: Sri Lankan
- Born: January 16, 1990 (age 36)
- Height: 190 cm (6 ft 3 in)
- Weight: 74 kg (163 lb)

Sport
- Sport: Swimming
Medal record
Representing Sri Lanka
South Asian Games
Silver medal – second place	2006 Colombo	50 m freestyle
Silver medal – second place	2006 Colombo	100 m freestyle
Silver medal – second place	2006 Colombo	4x100 m medley relay
Bronze medal – third place	2006 Colombo	4x100 m freestyle relay
Bronze medal – third place	2006 Colombo	4x200 m freestyle relay

Daniel Lee (born 16 January 1990) is a Sri Lankan swimmer. He competed at the 2008 Summer Olympics.

== Career ==
Lee was five medals at the 2006 South Asian Games that were held in Colombo, Sri Lanka. Lee silver medals in the 50m and 100m freestyle events, and the 4x100 metre medley relay. Lee also won bronze in the 4x100 and 4x200 metre freestyle relays.

In June 2008, Lee was selected to represent Sri Lanka at the 2008 Summer Olympics. The following year, Lee was named as the assistant coach of the Monash University Swimming Academy in Australia.
