= Virdhawal Khade =

Indian swimmer (born 1991)

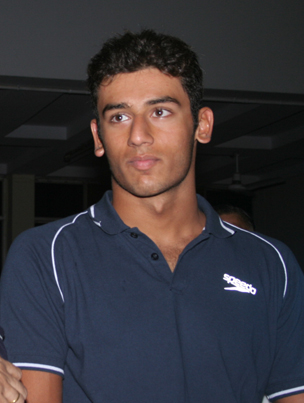
- Khade in 2008

Personal information
- Full name: Virdhawal Vikram Khade
- Born: 29 August 1991 (age 35) Kolhapur, Maharashtra, India
- Height: 6 ft 3 in (1.91 m)
- Weight: 187 lb (85 kg)

Sport
- Sport: Swimming
- Strokes: Freestyle, butterfly, medley
- Coach: Nihar Ameen
Medal record
Men's swimming
Representing India
Asian Games
Bronze medal – third place	2010 Guangzhou	50m butterfly
South Asian Games
Gold medal – first place	2006 Colombo	100 m freestyle
Gold medal – first place	2006 Colombo	200 m freestyle
Gold medal – first place	2006 Colombo	50 m butterfly
Gold medal – first place	2006 Colombo	4×100m freestyle relay
Gold medal – first place	2006 Colombo	4×200m freestyle relay
Gold medal – first place	2010 Dhaka	50 m freestyle
Gold medal – first place	2010 Dhaka	50 m butterfly
Gold medal – first place	2016 Guwahati	50 m butterfly
Gold medal – first place	2019 Kathmandu	4×100 m relay medley
Silver medal – second place	2016 Guwahati	50 m freestyle
Silver medal – second place	2019 Kathmandu	50 m freestyle
Silver medal – second place	2019 Kathmandu	50 m butterfly
Silver medal – second place	2019 Kathmandu	4×100 m relay freestyle

Virdhawal Vikram Khade (born 29 August 1991) is an Indian swimmer. He competed in the men's 50, 100 and 200 m freestyle swimming events at the 2008 Beijing Olympics. Khade won a bronze medal in the 50 meters butterfly event at the 2010 Asian Games in Guangzhou; it was India's first Asian Games medal in swimming in 24 years. He was conferred with the Arjuna Award by the Government of India in 2011.

== Career ==
Khade is the national record-holder in the 50m freestyle and 50m butterfly events. He is the senior National Champion, 2006 in 50m, 100m, 200m Freestyle and 50m Butterfly. He won six gold medals and broke three Games Records at the South Asian Games, 2006 and won six gold medals and broke five Games Records at the 33rd National Games in Guwahati.

He is the youngest ever Indian swimmer to qualify for an Olympics. Although he did not qualify for the semifinals of the 100m freestyle at the 2008 Beijing Olympics, he did finish first in his heat (Heat 3) and set a new personal best of 50.07 seconds, placing him 42nd overall. He came 48th in the 200 m freestyle and 32nd in the 50 m.

=== Commonwealth Games ===
At the 2010 Commonwealth Games, Khade participated in the 50m and 100m freestyle, 50m and 100m butterfly, and 4 × 100 m freestyle relay. He was part of the 4 × 100 m freestyle relay which made history by reaching finals and finishing at 6th position. He also qualified for the finals in 50m Butterfly event.

At the 2018 Commonwealth Games, Khade participated in the 50m Freestyle and 50m Butterfly events. He made it to semi-finals in the 50m butterfly event.

=== Asian Games ===
Khade won a bronze medal in the 50m Butterfly event at the 16th Asian Games, ending a 24-year wait for Indian swimming. Sachin Nag was the first Indian to win a swimming gold medal in 1951 Asian games held in New Delhi.

At the 2018 Asian Games, Khade participated in 50m Butterfly, 50m Freestyle, and 4 × 100 m Freestyle Relay. Khade finished 4th in the 50m Freestyle event, missing bronze medal by 0.01 seconds. Khade also reached the finals in the 4 × 100 m Freestyle relay where the Indian team broke national record in morning heats and finished 8th in finals.

=== South Asian Games ===
Khade won a gold medal in the 50m Butterfly and silver in the 50m Freestyle event at the 2016 South Asian Games.

He won a silver medal in the 50m Freestyle at the 2019 South Asian Games.

=== Asian Age-group Championships ===
Khade won gold medals in 50m Freestyle event and 4 × 100 m Freestyle relay at Asian Age-group Championships 2015.

In 2019, Khade won a gold medal at the 10th Asian Age Group Championship.

Khade was adjudged best athlete at the 34th National Games, held at Ranchi in the year 2011.

Virdhawal is coached by Nihar Ameen and trains in Bangalore. He is supported by GoSports Foundation, a sports non profit organisation that aims to promote sporting excellence in India.

== Statistics ==
A few of his best timings are:

- 50m Freestyle: 22.43sec clocked at 2018 Asian Games, Jakarta and Palembang, Indonesia, August 2018
- 100m Freestyle: 49.47sec clocked at 2008 Commonwealth Youth Games, Pune, India, October 2008
- 200m Freestyle: 1:49.86sec clocked at 2008 Commonwealth Youth Games, Pune, India, October 2008
- 400m Freestyle: 4:01.87sec clocked at the 51st MILO/PRAM Malaysia Invitation Open, May 2008
- 50m Butterfly: 24.09sec clocked at 2018 Asian Games, Palembang, Indonesia, 2018
- 100 Butterfly: 52.77sec clocked at Asian Age group swimming Championships, Japan, 2009

== Awards ==
In 2011, Khade was awarded with the Arjuna Award in the swimming category.

== Personal life ==
He is married to fellow swimmer Rujuta Khade.
