= Sharath Gayakwad =

Indian Paralympic swimmer

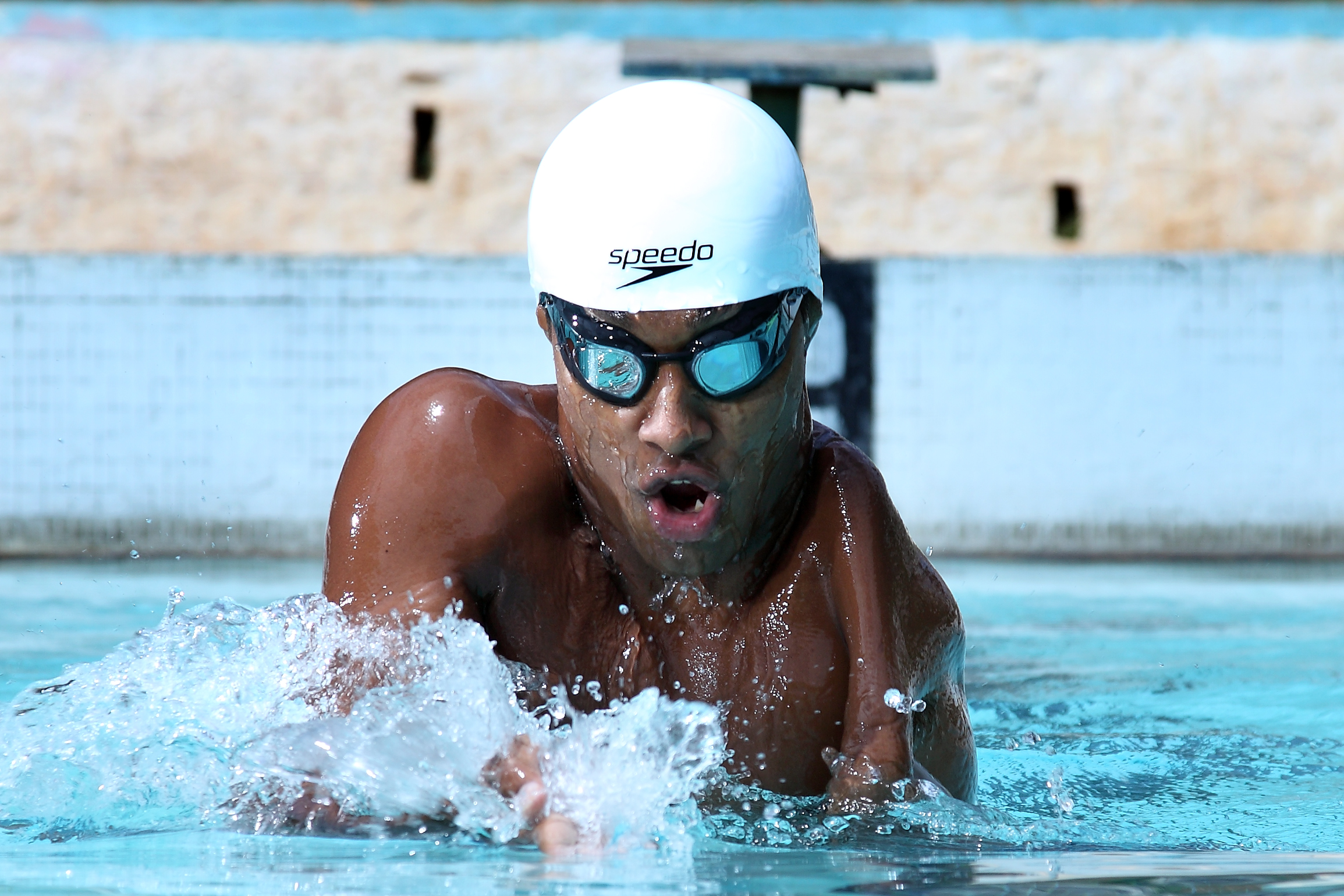

Personal information
- Full name: Sharath M Gayakwad
- Nationality: Indian
- Born: 10 May 1991 (age 35) Bangalore, India
- Education: Little Flower Public School, Bengaluru and Jain University, Bengaluru

Sport
- Country: India
- Sport: Swimming

Achievements and titles
- Highest world ranking: 13
- Updated on 1 July 2012

Sharath M. Gayakwad is an Indian Paralympic swimmer from Bangalore. At the 2014 Asian Games, he broke P.T. Usha's record for most number of medals by an Indian at any multi-discipline Event by winning 6 medals. Coming from a modest financial background, he has over 30 international and 40 national medals to his credit, one of them being the bronze medal at the 2010 Asian Para Games. He is the first Indian swimmer to qualify for the Paralympics and competed in the 2012 Summer Paralympics in London.

== Early years ==
Sharath was born in Bangalore, India in 1991 with a deformed left hand. He attended the Little Flower Public School in Bangalore, where his parents were initially apprehensive of sending him to mandatory swimming classes because of his disability. However, he eventually took up swimming classes at the age of 9 along with the rest of the class. Soon after that, he was to be seen participating in various swimming events for disabled people. In 2003, trainer John Christopher spotted him swimming at a school event, and ended up training Sharath for 7 years. Christopher explains that Sharath was the first paralympic swimmer he had coached, and that Sharath had to work a lot on maintaining equilibrium, because of his deformity. He attended Sri Bhagawan Mahaveer Jain College for high school studies, where he was given a fee concession and given encouragement for training.

== Swimming career ==
=== 2008 ===
Sharath Gayakwad has represented India at various national and international swimming events. He won four Gold, two Silver and two Bronze at the IWAS World Games, 2008.

=== 2010 ===
He won a Bronze medal clocking 1:20.90 in the 100m breaststroke at the 2010 Asian Para Games, Guangzhou, China. The performance also enabled Sharath to qualify for the Paralympics scheduled to be held in London in 2012. He was ranked No. 13 in the world in his category in 100m Breaststroke event in this year.

=== 2012 ===
He is the first Indian swimmer to achieve the qualifying time for London Paralympics, 2012. He has also won 1 Silver and 2 Bronze medals at the 2011 International Deutsche Meisterschaften (IDM) Swimming Championships in Berlin, Germany. Sharath is also the Asian record-holder in his category in two events – 50m Butterfly, 50m Breaststroke.

In 2012, GoSports Foundation sent Sharath to a high-performance training camp ahead of the London 2012 Paralympic Games. The camp was held in Perth, Australia, at the University of Western Australia. The Chief Coach Mel Tandtrum is a gold licensed swimming coach. Benefiting from the high-performance training, Sharath clocked personal best timings in all four events at London 2012.

=== 2014 ===
Struggling with shoulder injury leading up to the Asian Games in Incheon, Sharath ended up winning 6 medals. This was the highest tally of medals by an Indian at the Asian Games. This record was previously held by PT Usha who won 5 medals at the 1986 Seoul Asian Games.. Sharath Gayakwad won silver in 200m Individual Medley (SM8), bronze in Men's 100m Butterfly (S8), bronze in Men's 100m Breaststroke (SB8), bronze in Men's 100 Backstroke (S8) and a bronze in 50m Freestyle (S8). His 6th medal was a bronze in the Men's 4x100 Medley Relay.

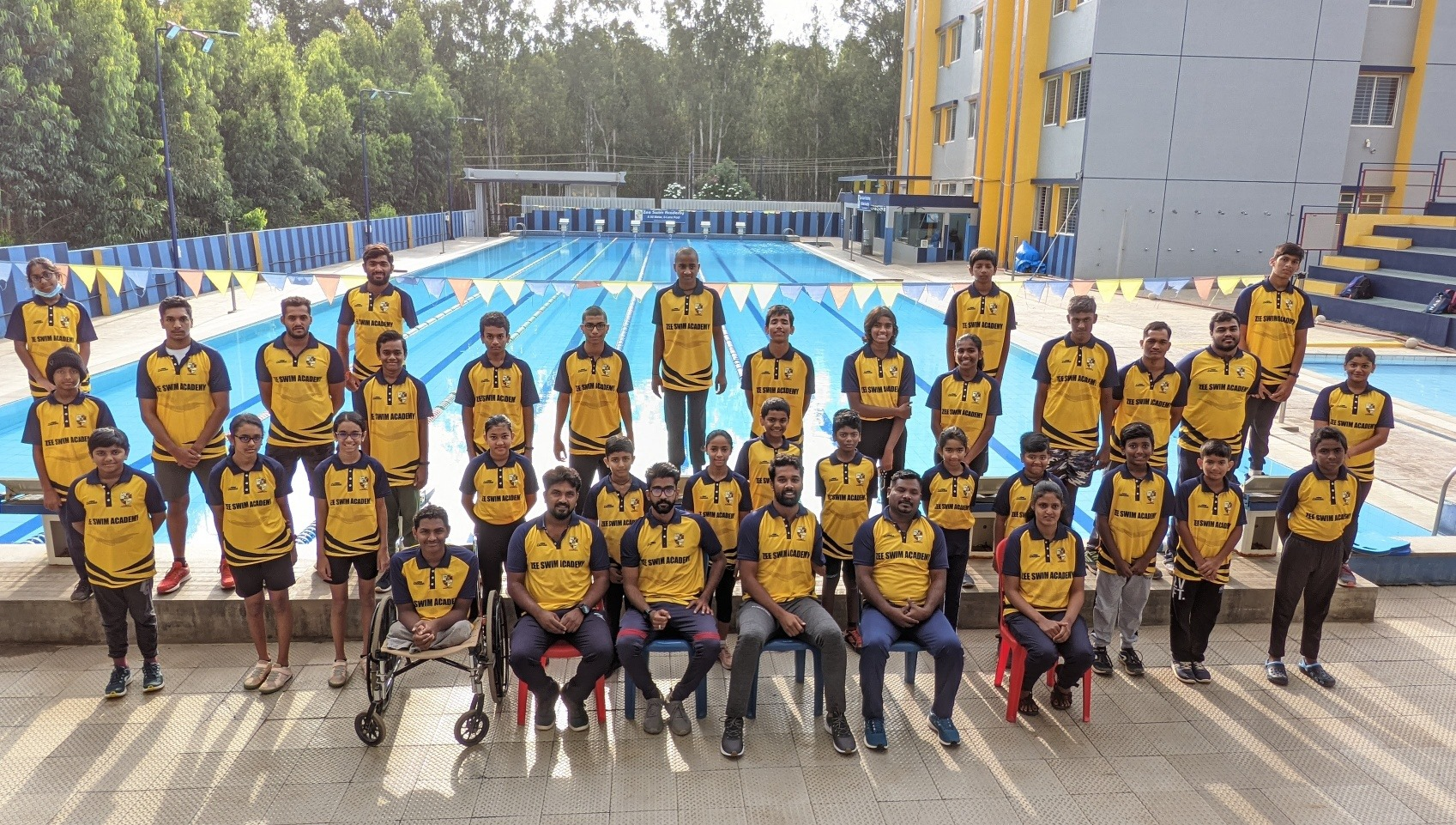
Sharath With his Students in 2020

== Coaching career ==
After Sharath's retirement from competitive swimming in 2014, he coached many state and national level swimmers from numerous swimming clubs in India. Currently, he is the program director of Zee Swim Academy, a swimming club in Bangalore.
