= Jewel Ahmed =

Bangladeshi swimmer (born 1983)

Muhammed Jewel Ahmed
Personal information
- Full name: Ahmed Mohamed Jewel
- National team: Bangladesh
- Born: 14 August 1983 (age 42) Dhaka, Bangladesh
- Height: 1.69 m (5 ft 7 in)
- Weight: 63 kg (139 lb)

Sport
- Sport: Swimming
- Strokes: Freestyle
Medal record
Representing Bangladesh
South Asian Games
Silver medal – second place	2004 Islamabad	100m butterfly
Silver medal – second place	2006 Colombo	50m butterfly
Silver medal – second place	2006 Colombo	100m butterfly
Bronze medal – third place	2004 Islamabad	50m butterfly

Ahmed Mohamed Jewel (also Jewel Ahmed, born August 14, 1983) is a Bangladeshi former swimmer, who specialized in sprint freestyle events. Ahmed qualified for the men's 50 m freestyle at the 2004 Summer Olympics in Athens, without having an entry time. He challenged five other swimmers in heat one, including 16-year-old Emile Rony Bakale of Congo. He posted both a lifetime best and a Bangladeshi record of 25.47 to earn a second spot by four tenths of a second (0.40) behind winner Bakale. Ahmed failed to advance into the semifinals, as he placed sixty-third overall out of 86 swimmers in the preliminaries.
