= Rakesh Manpat =

Indian sport shooter

Personal information
- Nationality: Indian
- Born: 7 May 1991 (age 35) Bangalore, India
- Education: Jain University, Bengaluru
- Occupation: Shooting
Medal record
Men's shooting
2016 Intershoot
Gold medal – first place	2016 Netherlands10 m air rifle	DAY 3
Silver medal – second place	2016 Netherlands10 m air rifle	DAY 1
Gold medal – first place	2016 Netherlands10 m air rifle	Team DAY 2
National Shooting Championship
Gold medal – first place	2013 New Delhi	50m Rifle Prone individual
Silver medal – second place	2010 Germany	10m Air Rifle individual

Rakesh Manpat is an Indian shooter from Bangalore. He completed his education from Jain University where he was in the junior division of NCC. In 2006, at 16, he became a Junior state champion, winning all gold medals. Rakesh Manpat was ranked third behind Gagan Narang and Abhinav Bindra at the Common Wealth Games Trials 2010.

At the 2010 World Championships at Zagreb, Rakesh Manpat represented India in all three rifle events. In the 50 Meter 3 positions event, he scored a 1160 and set a Junior Indian National Record, ranking 5th in the world. He also won a Junior International Silver medal in Suhl, Germany.

He won a bronze as a Senior at 55th Nationals Championships, a silver at 56th National Championships and finally a gold at the 57th National Shooting Championship in the men's free rifle prone category.

In 2016, he won a gold medal in the 3rd match of 39th InterShoot International Shooting Competition in the Netherlands, ahead of two Olympic and World Champions.

He founded the Elite Shooting Academy in 2017 and has been mentoring some of the finest rifle shooters in India. Notably two Women National Champions, Apurvi Chandela 2016 Olympian, World ranked #1 & Meghana Sajjanar world Ranked #15.

== Early life and background ==
Rakesh was born to father Late Manpat Krishna Murthy and mother Narsimha Srinivas Vijaya in Bangalore on 7 May 1991. He graduated with a Bachelor's degree in Business Administration from Jain University and is pursuing post-graduation. He began shooting in 2005 after being introduced to it by his brother Rajesh Manpat, also a Senior National Medallist in Rifle shooting. He then became the Junior State Champion and was selected to join the Junior Indian Team. Since 2009, he has been playing for the Senior Indian Team.

== Awards and recognition ==
- 2010 – Young Achievers Award by Brigade Group.
- 2011 – Karnataka Olympic Association Award.
- 2012 – Eklavya award by Chief Minister of Karnataka.
