= Mayumi Raheem =

Sri Lankan swimmer

Personal information
- Born: September 15, 1991 (age 34) Colombo, Sri Lanka

Sport
- Sport: Swimming
Medal record
Representing Sri Lanka
South Asian Games
Gold medal – first place	2006 Colombo	50m breaststroke
Gold medal – first place	2006 Colombo	100m breaststroke
Gold medal – first place	2006 Colombo	200m breaststroke
Silver medal – second place	2006 Colombo	50m freestyle
Silver medal – second place	2006 Colombo	200m individual medley
Silver medal – second place	2006 Colombo	4x100m freestyle relay
Silver medal – second place	2006 Colombo	4x200m freestyle relay
Silver medal – second place	2006 Colombo	4x100m medley relay
Bronze medal – third place	2006 Colombo	100m freestyle
Bronze medal – third place	2006 Colombo	400m individual medley

Mayumi Raheem (born 15 September 1991) is a swimmer from Sri Lanka who won 3 gold medals at the 2006 South Asian Games in the Women's 50 metres, 100 meters and 200 metres breaststroke. She also won 5 silver medals and 5 bronze medals, bringing her total to 11 medals, a record for any athlete at a single Asian Games.

She reached the semi-finals of the Women's 50m breaststroke at the 2006 Commonwealth Games in Melbourne, Australia, and represented Sri Lanka at the 2005 World Championships and the 2006 World Short Course Championships. She competed at the 2008 Olympics in Beijing and finished fourth in heat.

She holds numerous Sri Lankan national records.

She began swimming at the age of 8, and has been swimming ever since. She captained Sri Lanka's national swimming team at the 2006 Asian Games.

She lived in Singapore, where she completed the International Baccalaureate (IB) program at the United World College of South East Asia (UWCSEA). She has previously lived in Sri Lanka and New Zealand. In 2006, she placed second at the Singapore National Open Championships behind a US-based Singaporean athlete, to become the fastest woman over the 200m Breaststroke in Singapore. She was a member of Singapore Swimming Club from 2004 to 2007, where she trained under the Australian coach Jaan Murphy, to whom she has publicly attributed much of her success. When Coach Murphy returned to Australia, she then swam for Swim Fast Aquatic under the former Singapore national swimmer David Lim, before moving to the Grassroots Club to train under American coach Jack Simon.

She recently announced she will not be competing at the 2010 South Asian Games due to study commitments.

She is currently studying medicine in Sydney, Australia.
