= Rubel Rana =

Bangladeshi swimmer

Personal information
- Full name: Mohammed Rubel Rana
- National team: Bangladesh
- Born: 2 April 1983 (age 43) Amla, Bangladesh
- Height: 1.68 m (5 ft 6 in)
- Weight: 73 kg (161 lb)

Sport
- Sport: Swimming
- Strokes: Backstroke
Medal record
Representing Bangladesh
South Asian Games
Silver medal – second place	2004 Islamabad	200m individual medley
Silver medal – second place	2006 Colombo	50m backstroke
Bronze medal – third place	2006 Colombo	200m individual medley
Bronze medal – third place	2010 Dhaka	200m individual medley

Mohammed Rubel Rana (born 2 April 1983) is a Bangladeshi swimmer, who specialized in backstroke events. He was one of the five athletes to represent Bangladesh at the 2008 Summer Olympics, rounding out the field of 45 swimmers in the men's 100 m backstroke.

Rana competed for Bangladesh in the men's 100 m backstroke at the 2008 Summer Olympics in Beijing. Swimming on the outside in heat one, Rana closed out the field to last place with a lifetime best in 1:04.82, more than eight seconds away from the heat's fastest swimmer and 2004 Olympian Danil Bugakov of Uzbekistan. Rana failed to advance to the semifinals, as he rounded out the roster of 45 swimmers in the prelims. Rana was also the nation's flag bearer at the opening ceremony.
