= Karar Samedul Islam =

Bangladeshi swimmer

Personal information
- Full name: Karar Samedul Islam
- National team: Bangladesh
- Born: 15 July 1981 (age 44) Dhaka, Bangladesh
- Height: 1.60 m (5 ft 3 in)
- Weight: 60 kg (132 lb)

Sport
- Sport: Swimming
- Strokes: Breaststroke
Medal record
Representing Bangladesh
South Asian Games
Gold medal – first place	2004 Islamabad	100m backstroke
Bronze medal – third place	2004 Islamabad	50m breaststroke
Bronze medal – third place	2004 Islamabad	200m breaststroke

Karar Samedul Islam (born July 15, 1981) is a Bangladeshi former swimmer, who specialized in breaststroke events. Islam competed only in the men's 100 m breaststroke at the 2000 Summer Olympics in Sydney. He received a Universality place from FINA, in an entry time of 1:09.51. He challenged six other swimmers in heat two, including two-time Olympians Juan José Madrigal of Costa Rica and Jean Luc Razakarivony of Madagascar. With one swimmer casting out of the race for a no false-start rule, Islam rounded out the field to last place in 1:14.93, almost ten seconds farther behind leader Madrigal. Islam failed to advance into the semifinals, as he placed sixty-fourth overall on the first day of prelims.
