= Arjun Muralidharan =

Indian swimmer

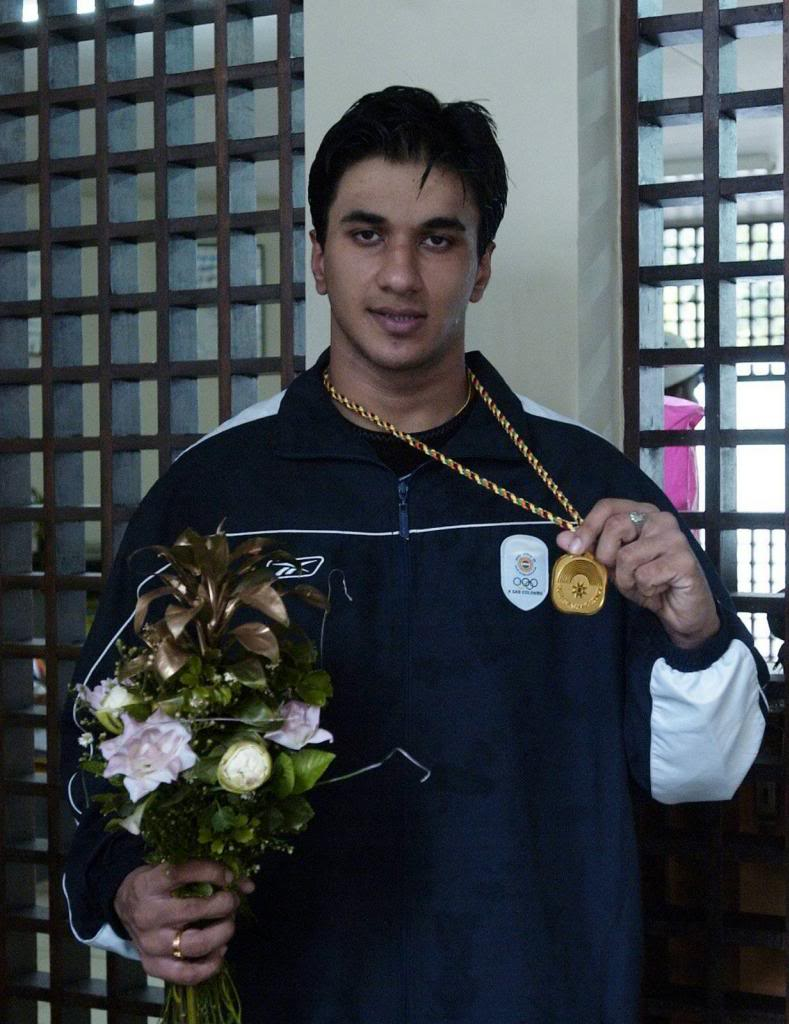
- Arjun at the 2006 South Asian Games

Personal information
- Nickname: The Beast
- Nationality: India
- Born: 14 May 1987 (age 39) Pune, Maharashtra, India
- Height: 1.85 m (6 ft 1 in)
- Weight: 89 kg (196 lb)
- Website: Bluewater Swim Academy Bluewater Sports Academy

Sport
- Country: India
- Sport: Swimming
- Events: Butterfly, backstroke, freestyle
- Club: Bluewater Swimming Academy
- Turned pro: 1995
- Coached by: CDR G Muralidharan, Byron MacDonald, John Grootveld, Sean Kelly, Nicholas Perron, Otto Kovacs, Amar Muralidharan

Achievements and titles
- Highest world ranking: (2006-2008) World 47, Canada 3 (200 Butterfly)
Medal record
Men's swimming
Representing India
South Asian Games
Gold medal – first place	2006 Colombo	50 m backstroke
Gold medal – first place	2006 Colombo	100 m butterfly
Gold medal – first place	2006 Colombo	200 m butterfly
Gold medal – first place	2006 Colombo	4×100 m freestyle relay
Gold medal – first place	2006 Colombo	4×200 m freestyle relay
Gold medal – first place	2010 Dhaka	100 m butterfly
Silver medal – second place	2006 Colombo	100 m backstroke
Silver medal – second place	2010 Dhaka	50 m butterfly
Commonwealth Youth Games
Bronze medal – third place	2004 Bendigo	200 m Butterfly
Asian Indoor Games
Silver medal – second place	2005 Bangkok	200 m Butterfly
Speedo Eastern Canadian Nationals
Gold medal – first place	2006 Montreal	100 m Butterfly
Manchester Open
Gold medal – first place	2007 Manchester England	200 m Butterfly
Canada Cup
Gold medal – first place	2008 Montreal	200 m Butterfly

Arjun Muralidharan (born 14 May 1987) is an Indian swimmer who has earned 15 national titles. He is widely considered as one of the greatest butterfly swimmers of India. He has also been the best swimmer in three consecutive Open National Championships from 2004 to 2006 and held all three (50, 100, 200 m) butterfly National titles for four years from 2004 to 2007 as well as all three (50, 100, 200 m) backstroke National titles in the year 2006. In 2006 he became the first Indian swimmer to win a gold medal at a foreign national championship in the Speedo Eastern Canadian Championships held at Montreal. He is also the first Indian swimmer to win a bronze medal at the Commonwealth Youth Games held at Bendigo, Australia, in 2004 and a silver medal in the Asian Indoor Games held at Bangkok in 2005. In the 2006 Asian Games held at Doha, Qatar, Arjun smashed his own national record in the 100 m butterfly. Arjun has won several Canadian National Championship medals and a gold medal in the 200 m butterfly at Canada Cup 2008.

== Early life and career biography ==
Born in Pune, Maharashtra, India Arjun started swimming at the age of 5 coached by his father G Muralidharan a former athlete, Ranji Trophy cricketer and Commander, Indian Navy. At a very young age of 9 he had already broken the age group national record in 50 meters butterfly. Arjun, the younger brother of Amar Muralidharan, is a former police officer working at the Border Security Force since 2002 up until 2014 under the sports recruitment program. He was also awarded the Director Generals citation in 2006 for his sporting achievements. He has trained in United Kingdom and Canada from 2006 to 2010 under reputed coaches. He has swum for Rouge et Or swimming team in Quebec in 2006, Stockport Metro Swimming Club in 2007 and Toronto Swim Club from 2008 to 2010.

== 1996 ==
Broke the Sub Junior Nationals Record held at Jaipur India in 50 meters Butterfly in the under 9 Age group with a time of 34.60 sec. The record still stands.

== 2000 ==
Was adjudged the best swimmer in the 17th Sub-junior aquatics championships held at Barielly India with 5 gold medals.

== 2002 ==
After a 6-month training camp conducted by Sports Authority of India in New Delhi, India under Hungarian coach Otto Kovacs Arjun was adjudged the best swimmer in the Junior national aquatic championships held at Chennai India winning 5 gold medals and 3 junior national records.

Along with his brother Amar, Arjun participated in the national Open water 10 km endurance swim race held at Pune finishing second with a time of 1 hour 4 mins and 55 seconds.

== 2004 ==
Became the youngest ever best swimmer at the age of 16 in the 58th Senior National aquatic championships held at New Delhi India. Arjun broke 3 championship records in the meet and won 3 gold medals and 2 silvers. His older brother Amar broke the championship record in the 200 meters Freestyle clocking 1:58.03. Arjun also became the youngest ever best swimmer at the All India Police Aquatic Championships held at New Delhi in September 2004.

Based on his performances in the Senior Nationals Arjun was selected to represent India at the Commonwealth Youth Games which was held at Bendigo Australia in Dec 2004. Arjun became the first and only Indian to win a medal coming third in the 200 meters Butterfly with a time of 2:06.99 beating teammate Rehan Poncha by .02 secs.

Arjun became the first and only swimmer in Indian swimming history to win the junior and senior national best swimmer trophies in the same year.

Became the best swimmer at the 53rd All India Police Aquatic Championships held at Talkatora Swimming Pool Complex, New Delhi

== 2005 ==
In 2005 at the 1st Asian Indoor Games held from 13 to 17 November 2005 at the SAT Swimming Pool, Huamark Sports Complex in Bangkok, Thailand Arjun became the first Indian swimmer to win a silver medal in the 200 meters butterfly event clocking 2:03.33 behind Won Jae-Yun of Korea.

Participating in the World Police and Fire Games in Quebec, Arjun beat the 20-year-old 100 m butterfly Indian best set by Khazan Singh, clocking 56.74 seconds to wipe out Singh's 1985 record of 56.84.

In 2005 Open National Championships Arjun became the first Indian swimmer to break the 28-second barrier in the 50 m backstroke clocking a national record time of 27.97. He was also judged the Best Swimmer of the meet with 4 gold medals.

== 2006 ==
Training in Quebec under the aegis of Sports Authority of India and the central government, Arjun along with elder brother Amar, participated under the banner of Laval University in the Speedo Eastern Canadian swimming championships held from 16 to 19 February in Montreal. Arjun won the gold in the 100 m butterfly event with the best-ever Indian performance of 0:56.20 seconds. The effort eclipsed his own mark of 56.74.

Arjun participated in the Commonwealth Games held in Melbourne Australia from 15 to 26 March 2006 and became the first ever Indian swimmer to qualify for semifinals in the 100 meters butterfly clocking 56.74 in the heats and 56.65 in the semifinals.

In the 2006 Open Nationals held at BAC, Bangalore, Arjun smashed all five national records and won the Best Swimmer for the third consecutive year with five gold medals. Arjun became the first and only Indian swimmer to win all 3 backstroke national titles with championship records simultaneously. This was the first and the last time Arjun swam the 200 M Backstroke.

In the 2006 South Asian Games held at Colombo, Sri Lanka, Arjun won three golds and a silver with a Games record in 200 m butterfly.

In the 2006 Asian Games held at Doha, Qatar, Arjun smashed his own national record in the 100 m butterfly with a time of 56.16 placing 13th overall ahead of teammate Ankur Poseria who placed 18th clocking 57.14.

== 2007 ==
After a 7-month training camp in Stockport United Kingdom training under British Olympic coach Sean Kelly Arjun became the first and only Indian swimmer to win all 3 butterfly national titles with championship records simultaneously in the 2007 Senior National aquatic championships held at Goa India.

== 2008 ==
Arjun trained at Toronto Swim club under former Munich Olympics 100 M Butterfly finalist Byron MacDonald and John Grootveld head coach at TSC.

In 2008 Quebec Cup held at Montreal Quebec Arjun became the first and only Indian swimmer to win a gold medal at a foreign long course National Championship in the 200 meters butterfly clocking a personal best of 2:02.57.

In 2008 Canada Cup Arjun won a bronze medal and broke the short course 200 butterfly national record clocking 1:59.45 and becoming the first Indian swimmer to break the 2 mins barrier in the event. The record still stands.

In 2008 October Arjun bettered several records in the All India Police meet becoming the Best Swimmer for the 6th time in a row.

== Injury and return to swimming in 2009 ==
On 17 January 2009 in Toronto Canada while heading towards Etobicoke swimming pool for a divisional competition Arjun suffered a jaw fracture from a car accident when his car was hit by an oncoming truck. He was treated at Mount Sinai Hospital in Toronto and subsequently returned to India for a few months. He returned to Toronto Canada and resumed swimming training late in July which affected his performances at the 2009 Open Nationals due to the long 6-month layoff and fracture rehabilitation process.

== 2010 ==
In 2010 South Asian Games Arjun won a gold medal in the 100 m butterfly.

Arjun also participated in the 2010 Commonwealth Games held at New Delhi India swimming the 50 and 100 meters butterfly events.

== 2011 ==
Was adjudged the best swimmer for the 7th time in his career in the All India Police Aquatic Championships held at Thiruvananthapuram, Kerala with 5 gold medals and 2 meet records.

== 2012 ==
Participated in the 2012 Life Saving World Championships held at Adelaide, Australia.

== Personal life ==
In addition to all his swimming accomplishments Arjun also trains in Martial Arts and is a 1st dan (shodan) black belt in Gōjū-ryū Karate and a first kyu brown belt in Shidokan.

In his spare time he coaches young children at Bluewater Swim Academy alongside his father and older brother at Pune. He has mentored and coached numerous sub junior and junior level national medalists.

Arjun is also the Director of Bluewater Sports Academy located at Baner Pune.

He has endorsed sportswear company Metal Mulisha and is also sponsored by Siddhi Health Club located at Kothrud, Pune where he has done his strength training since 2002.
