= Rubab Raza =

Pakistani swimmer (born 1991)

Personal information
- Native name: رُباب رضا
- Born: January 15, 1991 (age 35) Lahore, Pakistan

Sport
- Sport: Swimming
Medal record
Women's Swimming
Representing Pakistan
Women's Islamic Games
Gold medal – first place	2005 Tehran	50m freestyle
Silver medal – second place	2005 Tehran	4x100m freestyle relay
Bronze medal – third place	2005 Tehran	4x200m freestyle relay
South Asian Games
Silver medal – second place	2004 Islamabad	4x100m medley relay
Silver medal – second place	2004 Islamabad	4x100m freestyle relay
Bronze medal – third place	2004 Islamabad	100m backstroke
Bronze medal – third place	2006 Colombo	50m freestyle
Bronze medal – third place	2006 Colombo	50m backstroke

Rubab Raza (Urdu: رُباب رضا; born January 15, 1991) is a swimmer from Pakistan. She became Pakistan's first female Olympic swimmer at the 2004 Athens Olympics.

== Career ==
At the 2004 Summer Olympics, she swam the 50m Freestyle. She did not progress to the next round. She became the third Pakistani female to compete at the Olympics following Shabana Akhtar at the 1996 Olympics and Shazia Hidayat at the 2000 Olympics, shortly before the country's fourth female competitor, Sumaira Zahoor, who ran the 1500m at the 2004 Games a few days after Raza swam. At the age of 13 at the time of her Olympic swim, Raza was the youngest Pakistani female to compete at an Olympics.

The Pakistani Swimming Federation funded her with only $30 a month, but she was fortunate to have support from her father who is a retired army major and her mother who is a doctor.

She has won a number of national titles, and has seen success at Asian swimming tournaments. She also won a gold medal in 50m freestyle at Islamic Women's Solidarity Games in Tehran, Iran.

She has also swum for Pakistan at the:

- 2004 South Asian Games
- 2006 South Asian Games
- 2006 Commonwealth Games
