= Rasel =

Rasel may refer to:

- Rasel (singer), (born Rafael Abad Anselmo), Spanish singer
- Rasel (actor), Bangladeshi film actor
- Brian Rasel, American politician
- Syed Rasel, Bangladeshi cricketer
