= GoSports Foundation =

Nonprofit organisation in India

- Formation: 2008; 18 years ago
- Type: Non-profit organization
- Purpose: Supporting junior Olympic and Paralympic athletes
- Headquarters: Bengaluru, Karnataka, India
- Region served: India
- Services: Athlete scholarships, sports development programmes, mentorship and professional support

The GoSports Foundation (GSF) is an independent, donor-funded non-profit venture working towards securing funds and professional expertise for some of India's junior Olympic and Paralympic athletes. Established in 2008, it has worked with numerous athletes from across multiple Olympic and Paralympic disciplines through its scholarship programs.

== Special projects ==
- The Rahul Dravid Athlete Mentorships
- Shooting development programmes in association with the Abhinav Bindra Foundation.
- The GoSports Foundation Athletes’ Conclave is held with the objective of developing inspiration, promoting knowledge, and bonding among the athletes. The Conclave features seminars from some of India's leading sports industry experts as well as successful sportspersons.
- Coach Education Programmes for badminton coaches are held every year in association with the Badminton Association of India. The programs claim they ensure badminton training programs in India, for all age groups, fall in line with the National Training Program. This ensures that a larger talent pool is fed into the national circuit and creates a pool of well-informed coaches in different parts of the country.

== Athlete achievements ==
Some of the achievements of the athletes supported by GoSports Foundation:

1. GSF had 5 athletes representing India at the 2014 Commonwealth Games in Glasgow, Scotland: Sharath Gayakwad (Para-Swimming), Soumyajit Ghosh, Harmeet Desai (both Table tennis), Kidambi Srikanth and RMV Gurusaidutt (both Badminton), the latter winning the bronze medal in the Men's Singles category.
2. Sumit Antil won the gold medal in men's javelin throw F64 category at the 2020 Summer Paralympics.
3. Para-swimmer Sharath Gayakwad was India's lone representative in swimming at the London 2012 Paralympic Games.
4. Heptathlete Swapna Barman won gold at the 2018 Asian Games and placed first in the Heptathlon at the 2017 Asian Athletics Championships.
