= Rasol =

Rasol may refer to:

== Gastronomy ==
- Rasol (Romanian dish)
- Rasol (cabbage brine), a secondary product obtained by fermentation while making sour cabbage

== Places ==
- Rasol (Parvati Valley), a village in Parvati Valley, India
- Rasol, Odisha, a village in Odisha, India
