= Chenraj Roychand =

Indian educationist and entrepreneur (born 1961)

- Born: 7 July 1961 (age 65)
- Occupations: Educationist; Entrepreneur; Philanthropist
- Title: Chancellor of Jain University

Chenraj Roychand (born 7 July 1961) is an Indian educator, entrepreneur, angel investor and philanthropist. He founded the Jain Group and has been chancellor of Jain University since 1990.

== Career ==
In 1990, Roychand founded the Sri Bhagawan Mahaveer Jain College in Bangalore at VV Puram, later establishing additional schools and colleges. Jain University was declared a Deemed University under the University Grants Commission Act, 1956.

Roychand established the Chenraj Roychand Center for Entrepreneurship in 2001. The Center aims to support social entrepreneurship, and has incubated companies.

== Awards and accolades ==
Roychand has been associated with several recognitions mentioned in publications of the JAIN Group, including the Rotary Award for Vocational Service, Dr. B. C. Roy Award, Seva Ratna Award, and Kempegowda Award; however, independent secondary sources confirming these honours are not currently available.
