= Chakravarti Sulibele =

Indian writer (born 1980)

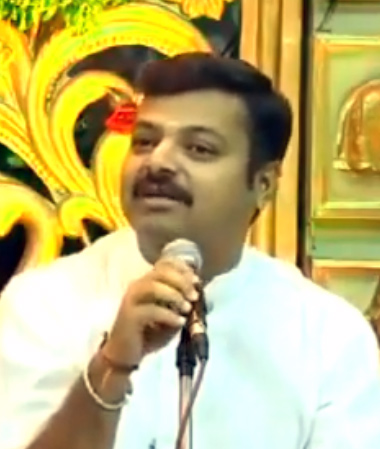
- Chakravarty Sulibele in 2017
- Born: 9 April 1980 (age 46); Sulibele Honnavar, Karnataka, India
- Years active: 2004–present
- Notable work: Neharu Parade Sariyitu, Gadar Chalavali, Vishwaguru, Kargil Kadana Kathana, Jago Bharat series,

YouTube information
- Channel: Chakravarty Sulibele
- Years active: 2010–present
- Genre: Political Stories
- Subscribers: 6.09 lakhs
- Views: 77.82 million
- Last updated: 19 June 2025

Chakravarty Sulibele (born 9 April 1980) is an Indian writer and political activist who predominantly writes in the Kannada and Hindi languages. He is the founder of Yuva Brigade and Sodari Nivedita Pratishtana.

== Early life ==
Sulibele was born on 9 April 1980 in Honnavar. He worked as chief editor for Hosa Svatantryada Belaku. He later worked as managing editor for Garva, a weekly tabloid, and was a regular columnist in Vijaya Karnataka for more than two years and still writing columns for Vijayavani, Hosa Diganta, Samyukta Karnataka, Karmaveera, Viveka sampada and some other magazines. He writes columns in Vijayavani under the name "Vishwaguru".

== Organization ==
Sulibele is the founder of 'Yuva Brigade', an organization involved in educating the youth on the contribution of soldiers to the nation, and patriotism.

== Political activities ==
In the run-up to the 2019 general elections he founded Team Modi, working on a mission to re-elect Narendra Modi as Prime Minister. He toured all 28 districts of Karnataka State.

== Notable works ==
Books written

- Apratima Desha bhakta Swatantra Veer Savarkar (1883 - 1966) (Kannada)
- Neharu Parade Sariyitu
- Swatantrya Mahasangrama - 1857 Ondu Vakchitra
- Pepsi – coke antaraala (ಪೆಪ್ಸೀ – ಕೋಕ್ ಅಂತರಾಳ)
- Mera bharat mahaan (ಮೇರಾ ಭಾರತ್ ಮಹಾನ್)
- Gadar Chalavali (2015)
- Bharata bhakta Vidyananda
- Jago Bharat - three parts
- Kargil Kadana Kathana (ಕಾರ್ಗಿಲ್ ಕದನ ಕಥನ)
- Vishwa Guru Bharatha Series 1-2
- Saradaara

Books translated

- Bharata mateya kare
- Go Chikitse
- Swadeshi mattu bharateeyate
