= Jain University =

Private university in Bengaluru, India

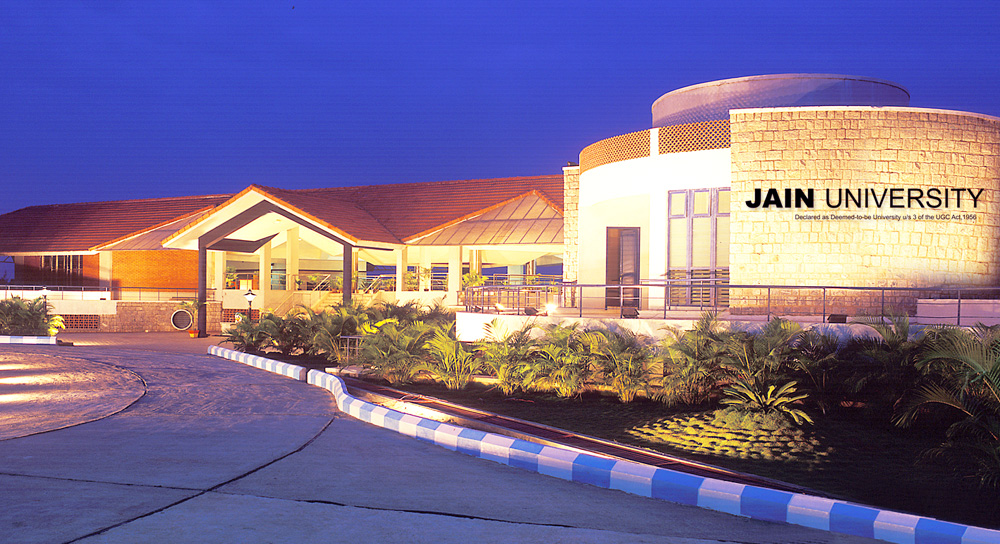
- Campus in Kanakapura, Bangalore
- Other names: Jain (Deemed-To-Be University), Jain Deemed University
- Former name: Sri Bhagawan Mahaveer Jain College (est. 1990)
- Type: Private, Deemed
- Established: 1990; 36 years ago
- Chancellor: Dr. Chenraj Roychand
- Vice-Chancellor: Dr. Raj (Bengaluru); Dr. J. Letha (Kochi)
- Location: Bengaluru, Karnataka and Kochi, Kerala; 12.9617°N 77.5849°E
- Website: www.jainuniversity.ac.in

Jain University, officially Jain (Deemed-to-be University) is a private deemed university in Bengaluru, Karnataka, India. The university established an off-campus centre in Kochi, Keralam, in August 2019.

== History ==
Jain (Deemed-to-be University) originates from Sri Bhagawan Mahaveer Jain College (SBMJC), established by the founder and chairman of Jain Group, Chenraj Roychand in 1990. It was conferred deemed to be university status in 2009.

== Academics ==
=== Academic programmes ===
Jain (Deemed-to-be University) offers more than 200 UG and PG programs in commerce, sciences, humanities and arts, engineering and technology and management. It also offers courses for working professionals in the field of Business Administration, Engineering and Information technology. The University also provides online UG programs like BBA and BCOM, and online PG programs such as MCA, MBA, M.Com, and MA.

== Accreditations and rankings ==
University and College rankings

General – India
- NIRF (Overall) (2023): 101-150
- NIRF (Universities) (2024): 65
- Outlook India (Universities) (2020): 68

Engineering – India
- NIRF (2024): 95

Business/Management – India
- NIRF (2024): 77

The National Institutional Ranking Framework (NIRF) ranked the institution 65th among universities, 77th among business schools and 95th in engineering in 2024. Jain University Online is Accredited by NAAC with 'A++' Grade.

=== Hostel accommodation ===
Jain (Deemed-to-be University) offers both on-campus (Jain Global Campus) and off-campus accommodations in different locations in Bangalore.

== Notable alumni ==
Alumni	Notability
Aditi Ashok	Professional golfer
Ambi Subramaniam	Violinist, musician and educator
Ann Augustine	Actress
Anup Sridhar	Badminton player
Bindu Subramaniam	Singer, songwriter, musician, author and entrepreneur
Chakravarti Sulibele	Writer, orator and social activist
Dhanya Ramkumar	Actress and model
Diganth	Actor and model
Gagan Ullalmath	Swimmer
Gaurav Dhiman	Cricketer
HS Sharath	Cricketer
Karun Nair	International cricketer
Kaunain Abbas	Cricketer
KL Rahul	International cricketer
Kriti Kharbanda	Actress and model
Manish Pandey	International cricketer
Mayank Agarwal	International cricketer
Niranjan Mukundan	Para-swimmer
Pankaj Advani	World champion billiards and snooker player
Pannaga Bharana	Actor, director and screenwriter
Prajwal Devraj	Actor
Prasidh Krishna	International cricketer
Rakesh Manpat	Sport shooter
Ravikumar Samarth	Cricketer
Rehan Poncha	Swimmer
Robin Uthappa	International cricketer
Rohan Bopanna	Professional tennis player
Rohit Havaldar	Swimmer
Ryan Ninan	Cricketer
Sagar Puranik	Actor and director
Samyuktha Hegde	Actress
Sharath Gayakwad	Para-swimmer and coach
Shikha Tandon	Swimmer
Shreyas Gopal	Cricketer
Srinidhi Shetty	Actress, model and beauty pageant titleholder
Varun Aaron	International cricketer

== See also ==
- List of deemed universities
- List of institutions of higher education in Karnataka
