= Amar Muralidharan =

Indian swimmer

Personal information
- Nationality: India
- Born: 3 August 1984 (age 42) Pune, Maharashtra, India
- Height: 1.84 m (6 ft 1/2 in)
- Weight: 79 kg (174 lb)
- Website: http://bluewaterswimming.com

Sport
- Country: India
- Sport: Swimming, Surf lifesaving
- Event: Butterfly
- Club: Bluewater Swimming
- Turned pro: 1995
- Coached by: CDR G Muralidharan, Byron MacDonald, John Grootveld, Sean Kelly, Nicholas Perron, Otto Kovacs
Medal record
Men's swimming
Representing India
Asia Pacific Championships
Bronze medal – third place	1999 New Delhi	200 m butterfly
Asian Age Group Championships
Bronze medal – third place	2002 Zhuhai China	400 freestyle
Afro Asian Games
Silver medal – second place	2003 Hyderabad	4×200 m freestyle relay
South Asian Games
Gold medal – first place	2004 Islamabad	200 m freestyle
Silver medal – second place	2006 Colombo	200 m freestyle
World Police & Fire Games
Gold medal – first place	2005 Quebec	200 m freestyle
World Life Saving Championships
Bronze medal – third place	2012 Adelaide	LC Meter Line Throw Relay

Amar Muralidharan is an Indian swimmer who has earned 6 National Titles. He held the 200 M Butterfly & Freestyle National Titles from 2000-2004. He has won a silver medal at the first Afro Asian Games held at Hyderabad India in 2003 and 3 gold medals at South Asian Games held at Islamabad Pakistan. He has also won several gold medals at World Police & Fire Games and won a bronze medal at 2006 Canada Cup in 4×200 meters freestyle relay swimming for University Laval. Amar represented India in the 2007 FINA World Swimming Championships held at Melbourne Australia. He swam the 200 M Freestyle and was part of 4×100 M Freestyle Relay Squad.

== Career Biography ==
Born in Pune, Maharashtra, India Amar started swimming at the age of 8 coached by his father G Muralidharan a former athlete, Ranji Trophy cricketer and Commander, Indian Navy. At a young age of 13 he had already won a gold medal in the age group nationals in 200 meters freestyle. He won a bronze medal in the 400 meters Freestyle event at the Asian Age Group swimming championships held at Zhuhai, China in 2002. Along with his younger brother Arjun, Amar participated in the national Open water 10 km endurance swim race held at Pune finishing first with a time of 1 hour 4 mins and 54 seconds. He has trained in United Kingdom and Canada from 2006 to 2010 under reputed coaches. He has swum for Rouge et Or swimming team in Quebec in 2006, Stockport Metro Swimming Club in 2007 and Toronto Swim Club from 2008-2010. Amar won the 50 Butterfly and 100 Freestyle events at 57th All India Police Championships held at Thiruvananthapuram, Kerala. He has served under Central Reserve Police Force from 1999 up until 2009 as an Inspector under the sports recruitment program. Won a bronze medal in the line throw event at the 2012 World Life Saving Championships held at Adelaide, Australia

== Personal life ==
Amar is the Assistant Coach of Blue Water Swimming Academy at Baner Pune. He also trains in Martial Arts and is 1st Dan black belt in Shotokan Karate.

He is the elder brother and current coach of Arjun Naik.
