= Sri Bhagawan Mahaveer Jain College =

Sri Bhagwan Mahaveer Jain College

Location
- No. 91/2, Dr. A N Krishna Rao Road, VV Puram, Bangalore, Karnataka; India

Information
- Motto: Courage–Purity–Knowledge–Efficiency
- Established: 1990; 36 years ago
- Gender: Co-educational
- Classes: Pre University Course, Undergraduate and Post Graduate
- Classes offered: Humanities; Commerce; Science
- Language: English, Kannada, Hindi, Sanskrit, French
- Campuses: In Bangalore
- Alumni: Rohan Bopanna; Pankaj Advani; Kriti Kharbanda; Meghana Gaonkar
- Website: www.jaincollege.ac.in

Sri Bhagawan Mahaveer Jain College (SBMJC) is a college in Bengaluru, Karnataka, India. It was established in the year 1990. It is founded by group of members of Jain society in VV Puram and it became a deemed university, the Jain University.

SBMJC has five campuses spread over Bangalore and one campus in Kolar Gold Fields. The college is home to more than 8,000 students.

Cricketer Robin Uthappa, swimmer Shikha Tandon and world snooker champion Pankaj Advani are some of the prominent sportsperson from the college.

In 2023, the Jain University faced a controversy when the state government recommended to the centre to remove the 'deemed' tag.
