= Heshan Unamboowe =

Sri Lankan swimmer

Personal information
- Full name: Heshan Bandara Unamboowe
- Nationality: Sri Lankan
- Born: 19 May 1992 (age 34) Handapanawa, Kandy, Sri Lanka
- Height: 1.78 m (5 ft 10 in)
- Weight: 69 kg (152 lb)

Sport
- Country: Sri Lanka
- Sport: Swimming
- Event: 100m Backstroke

Achievements and titles
- Olympic finals: London 2012
- Updated on 7 August 2012

Heshan Bandara Unamboowe (born 19 May 1992), is a Sri Lankan swimmer who has represented his country at international competitions. He was born in the town of Kandy to parents Dudley and Priyanga. He received his primary and secondary education at Trinity College, Kandy. He started schooling in Dharmaraja College, Kandy and joined Trinity College in Grade 2. Unamboowe went on to captain the Sri Lankan contingent at the first-ever Summer Youth Olympic Games 2010. At the event, Unamboowe set the National record in the 50m backstroke event. Unamboowe competed in the Men's 100m backstroke event at the 2012 Summer Olympics. He ranked 42nd and did not advance to the semifinals. He currently competes for Miami University in Ohio
