= 2006 South Asian Games =

X South Asian Games
- Host city: Colombo
- Country: Sri Lanka
- Nations: 8
- Athletes: 1554
- Events: 197 (in 20 Sports)
- Opening: 18 August 2006
- Closing: 28 August 2006
- Opened by: Mahinda Rajapaksa, President of Sri Lanka
- Main venue: Sugathadasa Stadium

The 2006 South Asian Games (also known as the 10th South Asian Games) were held in Colombo, Sri Lanka from 18 August to 28 August 2006, in the Sugathadasa Stadium with more than 2000 sportspersons competing in the record 20 disciplines of Sports.

The 10th edition of SAF Games also marked the debut for Afghanistan. Another highlight of 2006 SAF Games was unprecedented high levels of security for officials & players amid violent clashes between the Sri Lankan Government's troops and LTTE. Earlier in 2005, the Games, originally scheduled to be held in 2005, had been postponed following the Indonesian tsunami wave devastated the northern and eastern region.

== Mascots ==
Pora-Pol (an ancient sport of coconut fighting) and Wali kukula (a jungle fowl) were chosen as the official logo and mascot for the 2006 SAF Games, respectively.

== Sports ==
The 2006 South Asian Games encompassed a record 20 disciplines with hockey being reintroduced after several years.

- Archery (4)
- Athletics (35)
- Badminton (5)
- Boxing (11)
- Cycling (6)
- Field hockey (1)
- Football (1)
- Judo (11)
- Kabaddi (2)
- Karatedo (14)
- Rowing (7)
- Shooting (10)
- Squash (4)
- Swimming (38)
- Table tennis (7)
- Taekwondo (16)
- Volleyball (2)
- Weightlifting (8)
- Wrestling (8)
- Wushu (6)

== Participating nations ==
Athletes from eight countries competed at 2006 South Asian Games.

- Afghanistan (86)
- Bangladesh (192)
- Bhutan (54)
- India (293)
- Maldives (59)
- Nepal (216)
- Pakistan (288)
- Sri Lanka (366)

== Medal table ==
Note : This Section Needs to be Updated after Doping Tests

* Host nation (Sri Lanka)

Rank	Nation	Gold	Silver	Bronze	Total
1	India (IND)	118	69	47	234
2	Pakistan (PAK)	43	44	71	158
3	Sri Lanka (SRI)*	37	63	78	178
4	Nepal (NEP)	9	15	31	55
5	Afghanistan (AFG)	6	7	16	29
6	Bangladesh (BAN)	3	15	34	52
7	Bhutan (BHU)	0	3	10	13
8	Maldives (MDV)	0	0	0	0
Totals (8 entries)		216	216	287	719

== Schedule ==
OC	Opening ceremony	●	Event competitions	1	Event finals	CC	Closing ceremony

August	14th Mon	15th Tue	16th Wed	17th Thu	18th Fri	19th Sat	20th Sun	21st Mon	22nd Tue	23rd Wed	24th Thu	25th Fri	26th Sat	27th Sun	28th Mon	Events
Ceremonies					OC										CC	
Archery											●	2	2			4
Athletics											10	14	10	1		35
Badminton			●	●	5	●	●		2							7
Boxing						●	●	●	11							11
Cycling								2		2			2			6
Field hockey								●	●	●		1				1
Football	●		●			●		●		●	●		1			1
Judo													6	5		11
Kabaddi						●	●	●	●	●	●	●	2			2
Karate										4	2	2	3		3	14
Rowing						4		3								7
Shooting							2	4	6	2	6	4	2			26
Squash						●	●	2		●	●	●	2			4
Swimming						7	7	7	8	9						38
Table tennis					●	●	2	2	1	2			2			7
Taekwondo												5	5	3		13
Volleyball										●	●	●	2			2
Weightlifting						2	2	2	2							8
Wrestling												4	3			7
Wushu						●	●	●	12							6
Total events					5	13	13	22	42	19	18	32	42	9	3	218
Cumulative total					5	18	31	53	95	114	132	164	206	215	218	
August	14th Mon	15th Tue	16th Wed	17th Thu	18th Fri	19th Sat	20th Sun	21st Mon	22nd Tue	23rd Wed	24th Thu	25th Fri	26th Sat	27th Sun	28th Mon	Events

== Highlights ==
- Nagalingm Edirith Weeresinghe and Sriyani Kulawansa (both former Sri Lankan athletes) lit the Games torch at the opening ceremony.
- India made a clean sweep at Archery, Badminton, Rowing, Wushu.
- The Women's Kabaddi event was introduced.
- Maldives failed to claim any medal for the second consecutive time.
- Sri Lanka Swimmer Mayumi Raheem wins 10 medals (3 Gold, 4 silver, 3 bronze) a record for any athlete at a single games.

== Doping at the 2006 South Asian Games ==
The 10th SAF games could not be freed from infamous trend of steroid-using by athletes to boost their performance, as a group of athletes were reportedly tested positive for the use of banned performance-enhancing substance. Nine positive cases reported after more than 200 urine samples taken during the eight-nation Games were tested at an IOC ratified laboratory in Malaysia. Prominent athletes tested positive included Nepal's double gold-medalist athlete Rajendra Bahadur Bhandari, Pakistani boxers Nauman Karim (Fly Weight 51Kgs), Mehrullah Lasi (Feather Weight 57Kgs), Faisal Karim (Light Welter 64Kgs) and Sri Lanka's athlete Jani Chathurangani Silva. It rumoured on Media Reports that an Indian athlete have failed a dope test. Later Hemasiri Fernando, SriLankan Olympic Committee President said "No Indian Athlete has tested Positive".

Name	NOC	Sport	Banned Substance	Stripped Off Medal	Ban Duration	Awarded
Nauman Karim	Pakistan	Boxing (51kgs)	Anabolic Steroids	(gold) Gold	2 Years	(Sri Lanka) Harsha Kumara
Mehrullah Lasi	Pakistan	Boxing (57kgs)	Cannabis	(gold) Gold	6 Months	(India) Anthresh Lalit Lakra
Faisal Karim	Pakistan	Boxing (64Kgs)	Cannabis	(gold) Gold	6 Months	(Nepal) Sushil Ghimire
Rajendra Bahadur Bhandari	Nepal	Athletics (3000m)	Norandrosterone	(gold) Gold	2 Years	(India) Om Prakash
Rajendra Bahadur Bhandari	Nepal	Athletics (5000m)	Norandrosterone	(gold) Gold	2 Years	(India) Surendra Kumar Singh
Jani Chathurangani Silva	Sri Lanka	Athletics (100m)	Nandrolone	(silver) Silver	2 Years	(Pakistan) Sadaf Siddiqui
Jani Chathurangani Silva	Sri Lanka	Athletics (4×100m Relay)	Nandrolone	(gold) Gold	2 Years	India
