= 2010 South Asian Games =

XI South Asian Games
- Host city: Dhaka
- Country: Bangladesh
- Nations: 8
- Athletes: 2,000+
- Events: 23 sports
- Opening: 29 January 2010
- Closing: 9 February 2010
- Opened by: Sheikh Hasina, Prime Minister of Bangladesh
- Main venue: Bangabandhu National Stadium

Summer

Winter

The 2010 South Asian Games, officially the XI South Asian Games, was a major multi-sport event that took place from 29 January to 8 February 2010 in Dhaka, Bangladesh. This was the third time that the Bangladeshi capital hosted the South Asian Games, thus becoming the first city to hold the games three times.

Roughly 2000 athletes from eight countries competed at the games in 23 different sports. The sporting giant of the region, India, continued its dominance in the game's medal tally with a staggering 175 medals including 90 gold medals. Pakistan narrowly beat the host country in gold medals count with 19, while the host Bangladesh captured 18 golds including the region's most popular and prestigious football and cricket titles. Bangladesh, however, earned second spot in total medal count beating out Pakistan. Sri Lanka's Shehan Abeypitiya becomes the fastest man while Pakistan's Naseem Hamid was crowned the fastest woman of the region winning 100 meter sprint.

== Organization ==
The 11th South Asian Games were originally scheduled to take place in November 2009. However, the host country (Bangladesh) faced difficulties due to general elections. As a result, the South Asian Association Council (SAOC) held the 39th Executive Meeting and decided against hosting the Games in 2009, postponing the games to early 2010.

The estimated budget of the 2010 Games was about BDT 160 million (US$2.3 million).

The South Asian Games Organizing Committee (SAGOC) approved the formation of 20 sub-committees to focus on specific aspects of the games. The sub=committees included the ceremonious committee, the coordination committee, and the security committee.

== Logo and mascot ==
The logo of the 11th SAF Games was Kutumb: a doel, known in English as the Oriental magpie robin. It is the national bird of Bangladesh. The logo was designed by Bangladeshi artist Moniruzzaman. The mascot of the games also featured a magpie robin, which was holding the torch to begin the games.

== Participating nations ==
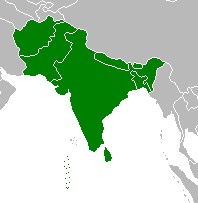
Participating nations.

A total of eight countries participated in the 2010 South Asian Games.

- Afghanistan
- Bangladesh
- Bhutan
- India
- Maldives
- Nepal
- Pakistan
- Sri Lanka

== Sports ==
A total of 23 sports competitions were held at the 11th SAF Games.

- Archery
- Athletics
- Badminton
- Basketball
- Boxing
- Cricket
- Cycling
- Football
- Golf
- Hockey
- Handball
- Judo
- Kabaddi
- Karate
- Shooting
- Squash
- Swimming
- Table tennis
- Taekwondo
- Volleyball
- Weightlifting
- Wrestling
- Wushu

For the first time, Twenty20 cricket was included in the Games. Except India, all participating nations sent under-21 teams for the cricket tournament.

Despite early rumours that hockey, volleyball, rowing, and wrestling were to be excluded from the Games, of the four only rowing did not make the final list of sports.

== Highlights ==
Following are the highlights of each of the sports:

Archery – Men & Women

India won all 4 gold medals in the men's and women's events. Host Bangladesh was a distant second with two silvers.

Athletics (Track & Field) – Men & Women

India and Sri Lanka dominated the event with India taking 10 gold and 11 silver while Sri Lanka followed with 7 gold and 8 silver. Pakistan won 4 gold while Nepal won a solitary gold.

Badminton – Men & Women

India won all 7 gold medals, dominating in both men's and women's events.

Basketball – Men

Afghanistan won the gold medal by beating India in the final while Bangladesh claimed the bronze in the men's basketball event.

Boxing – Men

India won 3 gold medals followed by host Bangladesh with 2 gold and a silver. Pakistan won 1 gold and 1 silver.

Cricket – Men

Under-21 Cricket T20 was introduced for the first time in the SA Games, with Bangladesh emerged victorious beating Sri Lanka in the closely contested final. Pakistan won the bronze by beating Maldives. India, the other test playing nation of the region, did not participate in the event.

Cycling – Men & Women

India dominated with 3 gold and a silver while Sri Lanka won 1 gold and 1 silver.

Football – Men & Women

Host Bangladesh reclaimed the regional supremacy by winning gold medal in the most one-sided final in the history of the game. They beat the surprise package Afghanistan in the final by 4–0. Bangladesh won each of their matches without conceding a single goal in their 5 matches including the final. Afghanistan, who rushed into the final for the first time in this regional showpiece, was unbeaten until the final registering wins against the likes of India, Maldives and the defending champion Pakistan. Maldives won the bronze by beating India.

In women's football, India won the gold medal beating Nepal in the final while Bangladesh claimed the bronze.

Golf – Men

Host Bangladesh made a clean sweep in both team and individual event. Team Bangladesh won the gold beating India and Sri Lanka who won silver and bronze respectively. In the Individual event, Bangladesh bagged all three medals.

Handball – Men

Pakistan won the handball gold beating India in the final. Bangladesh won the bronze.

Hockey – Men

Pakistan beat their arch-rival India in the final through tie-breaker to win the gold medal in hockey. After the teams ended the regular and extra time with 1–1 draw, Pakistan comes superior through penalty strokes by 4–3. Bangladesh edged past Sri Lanka to win the bronze.

Judo – Men & Women

India won 5 gold and 1 silver while Pakistan won 3 gold and 3 silver in Judo. India won both the gold medals in women's category while the men's glory were shared equally between India and Pakistan each winning 3 gold.

Kabadi – Men & Women

India maintained their supremacy in this regional sport by winning gold in both men and women event. Pakistan won the silver in men's category while Bangladesh bagged the silver in the women's Kabadi.

Karate – Men & Women

Bangladesh won 4 gold and 1 silver followed by Nepal with 3 gold and 2 silver. Afghanistan won two gold while Pakistan and Sri Lanka won 1 each. In the men's event Nepal and Afghanistan won two gold each while Bangladesh and Sri Lanka have 1 apiece. In the women's event, host Bangladesh dominated with 3 gold while Pakistan and Nepal shared the remaining two.

Shooting – Men & Women

India dominated in both men's and women's event bagging 19 out of 22 gold medals along with 8 silver medals. Host Bangladesh won the remaining 3 gold medals with 6 silvers.

Swimming – Men & Women

India and Sri Lanka dominated the pool with India winning 11 out of 12 gold in men's event, while 5 out of 7 in women's event. They also won 5 silvers in the men's and 2 in the women's category. Sri Lanka won 3 gold and 6 silver.

Squash – Men

Pakistan maintained their supremacy in squash winning both gold and silver in the individual event and gold in the team event. India and Bangladesh won silver and bronze respectively in team event.

Table Tennis – Men & Women

India made a clean sweep by winning all the 7 gold medals in this sport. They also won 5 silver medals. Sri Lanka claimed silver in both men and women team event.

Taekwondo – Men & Women

Afghanistan won 3 gold in men's event and 1 silver in women's while Nepal won 1 gold and 1 silver each in men's and women's event. India won two gold in the men's event, while Bangladesh won an equal number of gold in the women's event. Sri Lanka won 1 gold in the women's event.

Volleyball – Men

India, Pakistan and Sri Lanka won the gold, silver and bronze respectively in volleyball.

Weightlifting – Men

India won 3 gold and 1 silver followed by Pakistan, who won 2 gold and 3 silver. Sri Lanka won 2 gold and 2 silver while Bangladesh won 1 gold and 2 silver.

Wrestling – Men

India won 3 gold and a silver in wrestling while Pakistan won 2 gold and a silver. Afghanistan won 1 gold and 2 silver.

Wushu – Men & Women

India won 4 gold and 3 silvers, followed by Nepal with 2 gold and 2 silver. Bangladesh and Pakistan won 2 gold each.

== Medal tally ==
* Host nation (Bangladesh)

Rank	Nation	Gold	Silver	Bronze	Total
1	India (IND)	90	55	30	175
2	Pakistan (PAK)	19	25	36	80
3	Bangladesh (BAN)*	18	23	56	97
4	Sri Lanka (SRI)	16	35	54	105
5	Nepal (NEP)	8	9	19	36
6	Afghanistan (AFG)	7	9	16	32
7	Bhutan (BHU)	0	2	3	5
8	Maldives (MDV)	0	0	2	2
Totals (8 entries)		158	158	216	532

== Incidents ==
=== Reduced marathon ===
Due to preparations for the closing ceremony at the National Stadium (which was the actual finishing point for marathon ) in a last moment decision, the finishing line was relocated to outside of the National Stadium. However, the distance was not properly re-calculated and, after a Nepali athlete completed the race with 12 minutes less than the world record, it was noticed that the course only measured 35 km; over 7 km less than the required distance. The results of competition were allowed to stand but the times were deemed ineligible for record purposes.

=== Lift accident ===
Six Nepali athletes were slightly injured when a hotel lift crashed just hours before the launching of the games.

=== Cycling incident ===
One of the host nation's cyclists, Fatema Chingby Marma, was disqualified as she was being pushed by an enthusiastic local motor cycle rider from behind during the cycling event at Khulna - Gopalganj.

== Sponsors ==
- Grameenphone
- Agrani Bank
- Pepsi
- Bangladesh Olympic Association
