= Chess at the 2017 Asian Indoor and Martial Arts Games =

- Venue: Ashgabat Chess Centre
- Dates: 21–27 September 2017

Chess at the 2017 Asian Indoor and Martial Arts Games was held in Ashgabat, Turkmenistan from 21 to 27 September 2017 at the Chess Centre.

== Medalists ==
=== Men ===
Event	Gold	Silver	Bronze
Individual standard	Lê Quang Liêm; Vietnam	Lu Shanglei; China	Krishnan Sasikiran; India
Team blitz	Vietnam; Lê Quang Liêm; Nguyễn Ngọc Trường Sơn	China; Wang Yue; Yu Yangyi	Kazakhstan; Murtas Kazhgaleyev; Rinat Jumabayev
Team blitz	Vietnam; Lê Quang Liêm; Nguyễn Ngọc Trường Sơn	China; Wang Yue; Yu Yangyi	India; Krishnan Sasikiran; Surya Shekhar Ganguly
Team rapid	Vietnam; Lê Quang Liêm; Nguyễn Ngọc Trường Sơn	China; Wang Yue; Li Chao	Qatar; Mohammed Al-Sayed; Husein Aziz Nezad
Team rapid	Vietnam; Lê Quang Liêm; Nguyễn Ngọc Trường Sơn	China; Wang Yue; Li Chao	Turkmenistan; Meýlis Annaberdiýew; Saparmyrat Atabaýew
Team blitz (U23)	China; Wei Yi; Lu Shanglei	Iran; Alireza Firouzja; Parham Maghsoudloo	Philippines; Jem Garcia; Paulo Bersamina
Team blitz (U23)	China; Wei Yi; Lu Shanglei	Iran; Alireza Firouzja; Parham Maghsoudloo	India; Diptayan Ghosh; Vaibhav Suri
Team rapid (U23)	China; Wei Yi; Xu Yinglun	Philippines; Jem Garcia; Paulo Bersamina	Turkmenistan; Maksat Atabaýew; Ýusup Atabaýew
Team rapid (U23)	China; Wei Yi; Xu Yinglun	Philippines; Jem Garcia; Paulo Bersamina	India; Karthikeyan Murali; Diptayan Ghosh

=== Women ===
Event	Gold	Silver	Bronze
Individual standard	Tan Zhongyi; China	Lei Tingjie; China	Dinara Saduakassova; Kazakhstan
Team blitz	China; Tan Zhongyi; Lei Tingjie	Vietnam; Phạm Lê Thảo Nguyên; Hoàng Thị Bảo Trâm	Uzbekistan; Irina Gevorgyan; Nodira Nodirjanova
Team blitz	China; Tan Zhongyi; Lei Tingjie	Vietnam; Phạm Lê Thảo Nguyên; Hoàng Thị Bảo Trâm	Turkmenistan; Mähri Geldiýewa; Hurma Weliýewa
Team rapid	China; Tan Zhongyi; Lei Tingjie	Indonesia; Irene Kharisma Sukandar; Medina Warda Aulia	India; Padmini Rout; Tania Sachdev
Team rapid	China; Tan Zhongyi; Lei Tingjie	Indonesia; Irene Kharisma Sukandar; Medina Warda Aulia	Vietnam; Phạm Lê Thảo Nguyên; Nguyễn Thị Thanh An
Team blitz (U23)	Iran; Sara Khademalsharieh; Mobina Alinasab	China; Wang Jue; Guo Qi	Kazakhstan; Zhansaya Abdumalik; Dinara Saduakassova
Team blitz (U23)	Iran; Sara Khademalsharieh; Mobina Alinasab	China; Wang Jue; Guo Qi	Indonesia; Chelsie Monica Ignesias Sihite; Ummi Fisabilillah
Team rapid (U23)	Kazakhstan; Dinara Saduakassova; Zhansaya Abdumalik	China; Guo Qi; Wang Jue	Vietnam; Nguyễn Thị Mai Hưng; Đoàn Thị Vân Anh
Team rapid (U23)	Kazakhstan; Dinara Saduakassova; Zhansaya Abdumalik	China; Guo Qi; Wang Jue	Philippines; Janelle Mae Frayna; Shania Mae Mendoza

== Medal table ==
Rank	Nation	Gold	Silver	Bronze	Total
1	China (CHN)	5	6	0	11
2	Vietnam (VIE)	3	1	2	6
3	Iran (IRI)	1	1	0	2
4	Kazakhstan (KAZ)	1	0	3	4
5	Philippines (PHI)	0	1	2	3
6	Indonesia (INA)	0	1	1	2
7	India (IND)	0	0	5	5
8	Turkmenistan (TKM)	0	0	3	3
9	Qatar (QAT)	0	0	1	1
9	Uzbekistan (UZB)	0	0	1	1
Totals (10 entries)		10	10	18	38

== Results ==
=== Men ===
==== Individual standard ====
21–24 September

Rank	Athlete	R1	R2	R3	R4	R5	R6	R7	Pts
1st place, gold medalist(s)	Lê Quang Liêm (VIE)	TKM2; 1	TKM1; 1	IRI2; 1	CHN1 ½	IND1 ½	KAZ1; 1	IRI1 ½	5½
2nd place, silver medalist(s)	Lu Shanglei (CHN)	LBN1; 1	TJK1; 1	INA1; 1	VIE1 ½	VIE2; 1	IND1 ½	IND2 ½	5½
3rd place, bronze medalist(s)	Krishnan Sasikiran (IND)	KGZ2; 1	VIE2 ½	INA2; 1	BAN1; 1	VIE1 ½	CHN1 ½	TKM1 ½	5
4	Mikhail Markov (KGZ)	IND2 ½	KAZ2; 1	KAZ1 ½	TJK1 ½	IRI2 ½	QAT1; 1	UZB1; 1	5
5	Enamul Hossain (BAN)	MDV2; 1	IRI1; 1	CHN2 ½	IND1; 0	INA1 ½	MYA2; 1	VIE2; 1	5
6	Pouya Idani (IRI)	THA1; 1	BAN1; 0	JOR1; 1	INA2; 1	IND2; 1	VIE2 ½	VIE1 ½	5
7	Murtas Kazhgaleyev (KAZ)	MYA2; 1	BAN2 ½	KGZ1 ½	MYA1; 1	TKM2; 1	VIE1; 0	CHN2 ½	4½
8	Wang Yue (CHN)	UZB2; 1	PHI2; 1	BAN1 ½	VIE2; 0	TKM1 ½	TJK1; 1	KAZ1 ½	4½
9	Surya Shekhar Ganguly (IND)	KGZ1 ½	JOR1 ½	KGZ2; 1	BAN2; 1	IRI1; 0	QAT2; 1	CHN1 ½	4½
10	Muhammad Khusenkhojaev (TJK)	AFG1; 1	CHN1; 0	THA1; 1	KGZ1 ½	PHI1; 1	CHN2; 0	TKM2; 1	4½
11	Meýlis Annaberdiýew (TKM)	NEP1; 1 WO	VIE1; 0	LBN2; 1	INA1 ½	CHN2 ½	JOR1; 1	IND1 ½	4½
12	Đào Thiên Hải (VIE)	SRI1; 1	IND1 ½	UZB1; 1	CHN2; 1	CHN1; 0	IRI1 ½	BAN1; 0	4
13	Novendra Priasmoro (INA)	MAC1; 1	PHI1; 1	CHN1; 0	TKM1 ½	BAN1 ½	KAZ2 ½	IRI2 ½	4
14	Parham Maghsoudloo (IRI)	LBN2; 1	MYA1; 1	VIE1; 0	QAT2 ½	KGZ1 ½	TKM2 ½	INA1 ½	4
15	Rinat Jumabayev (KAZ)	JOR1 ½	KGZ1; 0	UZB2 ½	THA1; 1	UAE1; 1	INA1 ½	BAN2 ½	4
16	Mohammed Al-Sayed (QAT)	SRI2; 1	INA2; 0	UAE1 ½	PHI2; 1	QAT2 ½	KGZ1; 0	KGZ2; 1	4
17	Abdullah Al Rakib (BAN)	JOR2; 1	KAZ1 ½	QAT2 ½	IND2; 0	KGZ2 ½	LBN2; 1	KAZ2 ½	4
18	Julio Sadorra (PHI)	UAE1 ½	INA1; 0	LBN1; 1	TJK2; 1	TJK1; 0	KGZ2 ½	JOR1; 1	4
19	Eugene Torre (PHI)	THA2; 1	CHN2; 0	TJK2 ½	QAT1; 0	LBN1 ½	UZB2; 1	INA2; 1	4
20	Wynn Zaw Htun (MYA)	AFG2; 1	IRI2; 0	SRI2; 1	KAZ1; 0	JOR1; 0	SRI1; 1	MDV1; 1	4
21	Hanjar Ödäýew (TKM)	VIE1; 0	SRI1; 1	NEP1; 1	UZB1; 1	KAZ1; 0	IRI2 ½	TJK1; 0	3½
22	Husein Aziz Nezad (QAT)	MDV1; 1	UZB1 ½	BAN2 ½	IRI2 ½	QAT1 ½	IND2; 0	LBN1 ½	3½
23	Fadi Eid (LBN)	CHN1; 0	AFG2 ½	PHI1; 0	AFG1; 1	PHI2 ½	SRI2; 1	QAT2 ½	3½
24	Jakhongir Vakhidov (UZB)	TJK2; 1	QAT2 ½	VIE2; 0	TKM2; 0	THA2; 1	UAE1; 1	KGZ1; 0	3½
25	Jasem Al-Huwar (UAE)	PHI1 ½	UZB2 ½	QAT1 ½	THA2; 1	KAZ2; 0	UZB1; 0	LBN2; 1	3½
26	Alisher Begmuratov (UZB)	CHN2; 0	UAE1 ½	KAZ2 ½	SRI2; 1	LBN2 ½	PHI2; 0	MYA2; 1	3½
27	Ahmad Al-Khatib (JOR)	KAZ2 ½	IND2 ½	IRI1; 0	SRI1; 1	MYA1; 1	TKM1; 0	PHI1; 0	3
28	Semetey Tologontegin (KGZ)	IND1; 0	AFG1; 1	IND2; 0	NEP1; 1	BAN2 ½	PHI1 ½	QAT1; 0	3
29	Muhammad Lutfi Ali (INA)	MAC2; 1	QAT1; 1	IND1; 0	IRI1; 0	MYA2; 0	TJK2; 1	PHI2; 0	3
30	Kyaw Lin Naing (MYA)	KAZ1; 0	THA2; 0	MDV2; 1	JOR2; 1	INA2; 1	BAN1; 0	UZB2; 0	3
31	Mohamed Shuaau (MDV)	QAT2; 0	LBN2; 0	SRI1; 0	MAC1; 1	NEP1; 1	THA2; 1	MYA1; 0	3
32	Habibullah Amini (AFG)	TJK1; 0	KGZ2; 0	MAC2; 1	LBN1; 0	AFG2 ½	THA1 ½	SRI2; 1	3
33	Ahmad Najjar (LBN)	IRI2; 0	MDV1; 1	TKM1; 0	AFG2; 1	UZB2 ½	BAN2; 0	UAE1; 0	2½
34	Thanadon Kulpruethanon (THA)	IRI1; 0	JOR2; 1	TJK1; 0	KAZ2; 0	TJK2 ½	AFG1 ½	SRI1 ½	2½
35	Romesh Weerawardane (SRI)	VIE2; 0	TKM2; 0	MDV1; 1	JOR1; 0	MDV2; 1	MYA1; 0	THA1 ½	2½
36	Alisher Karimov (TJK)	UZB1; 0	MAC1; 1	PHI2 ½	PHI1; 0	THA1 ½	INA2; 0	AFG2 ½	2½
37	Atippat Pornariyasombat (THA)	PHI2; 0	MYA2; 1	AFG2 ½	UAE1; 0	UZB1; 0	MDV1; 0	MAC2; 1	2½
38	Sulaiman Ahmad Ashrafi (AFG)	MYA1; 0	LBN1 ½	THA2 ½	LBN2; 0	AFG1 ½	NEP1 ½	TJK2 ½	2½
39	Madan Krishna Kayastha (NEP)	TKM1; 0 WO	MAC2; 1	TKM2; 0	KGZ2; 0	MDV1; 0	AFG2 ½	MAC1; 1	2½
40	Rajeendra Kalugampitiya (SRI)	QAT1; 0	MDV2; 1	MYA1; 0	UZB2; 0	JOR2; 1	LBN1; 0	AFG1; 0	2
41	Ahmed Ashraf (MDV)	BAN1; 0	SRI2; 0	MYA2; 0	MAC2; 1	SRI1; 0	MAC1; 0	JOR2; 1	2
42	Malek Saif (JOR)	BAN2; 0	THA1; 0	MAC1; 1	MYA2; 0	SRI2; 0	MAC2 ½	MDV2; 0	1½
43	Lei Ka Chon (MAC)	INA1; 0	TJK2; 0	JOR2; 0	MDV1; 0	MAC2 ½	MDV2; 1	NEP1; 0	1½
44	Ip Seng Tou (MAC)	INA2; 0	NEP1; 0	AFG1; 0	MDV2; 0	MAC1 ½	JOR2 ½	THA2; 0	1

==== Team blitz ====
27 September

===== Swiss round =====
Rank	Team	R1	R2	R3	R4	R5	GP	MP
1	China (CHN)	BAN; 2–0	IRI; 1½–½	IND; 1½–½	VIE; 1–1	TKM; 2–0	8	9
2	India (IND)	KGZ; 1½–½	AFG; 2–0	CHN ½–1½	INA; 2–0	VIE; 1–1	7	7
3	Vietnam (VIE)	INA; 1–1	SRI; 2–0	KAZ; 1½–½	CHN; 1–1	IND; 1–1	6½	7
4	Kazakhstan (KAZ)	LBN; 2–0	UZB; 1–1	VIE ½–1½	IRI; 1–1	KGZ; 2–0	6½	6
5	Uzbekistan (UZB)	MDV; 2–0 WO	KAZ; 1–1	INA; 1–1	KGZ; 1–1	IRI; 1–1	6	6
6	Indonesia (INA)	VIE; 1–1	UAE; 2–0	UZB; 1–1	IND; 0–2	LBN; 2–0	6	6
7	Philippines (PHI)	UAE; 1–1	TKM; 1–1	IRI; 1–1	LBN; 1–1	BAN; 1½–½	5½	6
8	Iran (IRI)	THA; 2–0	CHN ½–1½	PHI; 1–1	KAZ; 1–1	UZB; 1–1	5½	5
9	Turkmenistan (TKM)	SRI; 1–1	PHI; 1–1	LBN; 1–1	QAT; 2–0	CHN; 0–2	5	5
10	Kyrgyzstan (KGZ)	IND ½–1½	QAT; 1–1	AFG; 2–0	UZB; 1–1	KAZ; 0–2	4½	4
11	Bangladesh (BAN)	CHN; 0–2	THA; 1–1	QAT; 1–1	UAE; 2–0	PHI ½–1½	4½	4
12	Qatar (QAT)	AFG ½–1½	KGZ; 1–1	BAN; 1–1	TKM; 0–2	THA; 2–0	4½	4
13	Lebanon (LBN)	KAZ; 0–2	MDV; 2–0 WO	TKM; 1–1	PHI; 1–1	INA; 0–2	4	4
14	Sri Lanka (SRI)	TKM; 1–1	VIE; 0–2	BYE; 1	THA; 1–1	AFG; 1–1	4	4
15	Afghanistan (AFG)	QAT; 1½–½	IND; 0–2	KGZ; 0–2	BYE; 1	SRI; 1–1	3½	4
16	United Arab Emirates (UAE)	PHI; 1–1	INA; 0–2	THA; 1–1	BAN; 0–2	BYE; 1	3	3
17	Thailand (THA)	IRI; 0–2	BAN; 1–1	UAE; 1–1	SRI; 1–1	QAT; 0–2	3	3
18	Maldives (MDV)	UZB; 0–2 WO	LBN; 0–2 WO				0	0

===== Knockout round =====
Semifinals		Final
China	1½
Kazakhstan	½	China	0
India	½	Vietnam	2
Vietnam	1½

==== Team rapid ====
===== Swiss round =====
25–26 September

Rank	Team	R1	R2	R3	R4	R5	GP	MP
1	China (CHN)	KGZ; 1½–½	INA; 1½–½	PHI; 1½–½	VIE; 1–1	IND; 1½–½	7	9
2	Turkmenistan (TKM)	IND; 1½–½	IRI; 1–1	QAT; 2–0	KAZ; 1½–½	VIE; 1–1	7	8
3	Vietnam (VIE)	UZB; 2–0	BAN; 2–0	KAZ; 1–1	CHN; 1–1	TKM; 1–1	7	7
4	Qatar (QAT)	MDV; 2–0	KAZ; 1–1	TKM; 0–2	PHI; 2–0	IRI; 1½–½	6½	7
5	Uzbekistan (UZB)	VIE; 0–2	KGZ; 1–1	UAE; 2–0	LBN; 2–0	BAN; 1–1	6	6
6	Bangladesh (BAN)	THA; 2–0	VIE; 0–2	LBN; 1–1	AFG; 2–0	UZB; 1–1	6	6
7	Iran (IRI)	UAE; 1½–½	TKM; 1–1	INA; 1½–½	IND; 1–1	QAT ½–1½	5½	6
8	Kazakhstan (KAZ)	LBN; 2–0	QAT; 1–1	VIE; 1–1	TKM ½–1½	INA; 1–1	5½	5
9	India (IND)	TKM ½–1½	SRI; 1½–½	THA; 2–0	IRI; 1–1	CHN ½–1½	5½	5
10	Kyrgyzstan (KGZ)	CHN ½–1½	UZB; 1–1	SRI; 1½–½	INA; 1–1	PHI; 1–1	5	5
11	Lebanon (LBN)	KAZ; 0–2	AFG; 2–0	BAN; 1–1	UZB; 0–2	THA; 2–0	5	5
12	Indonesia (INA)	AFG; 2–0	CHN ½–1½	IRI ½–1½	KGZ; 1–1	KAZ; 1–1	5	4
13	Philippines (PHI)	SRI; 1–1	UAE; 2–0	CHN ½–1½	QAT; 0–2	KGZ; 1–1	4½	4
14	Afghanistan (AFG)	INA; 0–2	LBN; 0–2	MDV; 2–0	BAN; 0–2	SRI; 2–0	4	4
15	Thailand (THA)	BAN; 0–2	MDV; 2–0	IND; 0–2	UAE; 1–1	LBN; 0–2	3	3
16	United Arab Emirates (UAE)	IRI ½–1½	PHI; 0–2	UZB; 0–2	THA; 1–1	MDV; 1½–½	3	3
17	Sri Lanka (SRI)	PHI; 1–1	IND ½–1½	KGZ ½–1½	MDV ½–1½	AFG; 0–2	2½	1
18	Maldives (MDV)	QAT; 0–2	THA; 0–2	AFG; 0–2	SRI; 1½–½	UAE ½–1½	2	2

===== Knockout round =====
26 September

Semifinals		Final
China	2
Qatar	0	China	½
Turkmenistan	1 (0)	Vietnam	1½
Vietnam	1 (1)

==== Team blitz (U23) ====
27 September

===== Swiss round =====
Rank	Team	R1	R2	R3	R4	R5	GP	MP
1	China (CHN)	INA; 0–2	THA; 2–0	VIE; 2–0	KAZ; 2–0	IND; 1½–½	7½	8
2	Iran (IRI)	VIE; 2–0	KAZ ½–1½	UZB; 2–0	PHI; 1–1	TKM; 2–0	7½	7
3	India (IND)	TJK; 2–0	UZB; 1½–½	PHI; 1½–½	TKM; 1½–½	CHN ½–1½	7	8
4	Philippines (PHI)	THA; 2–0	INA; 2–0	IND ½–1½	IRI; 1–1	UZB; 1–1	6½	6
5	Turkmenistan (TKM)	JOR; 1½–½	AFG; 2–0	KAZ; 2–0	IND ½–1½	IRI; 0–2	6	6
6	Vietnam (VIE)	IRI; 0–2	QAT; 2–0	CHN; 0–2	INA; 2–0	JOR; 2–0	6	6
7	Kazakhstan (KAZ)	QAT; 2–0	IRI; 1½–½	TKM; 0–2	CHN; 0–2	MAC; 2–0	5½	6
8	Uzbekistan (UZB)	MAC; 2–0	IND ½–1½	IRI; 0–2	TJK; 2–0	PHI; 1–1	5½	5
9	Jordan (JOR)	TKM ½–1½	TJK; 1½–½	INA; 1½–½	AFG; 1–1	VIE; 0–2	4½	5
10	Indonesia (INA)	CHN; 2–0	PHI; 0–2	JOR ½–1½	VIE; 0–2	AFG; 2–0	4½	4
11	Afghanistan (AFG)	BYE; 1	TKM; 0–2	MAC; 2–0	JOR; 1–1	INA; 0–2	4	4
12	Tajikistan (TJK)	IND; 0–2	JOR ½–1½	THA; 2–0	UZB; 0–2	BYE; 1	3½	3
13	Thailand (THA)	PHI; 0–2	CHN; 0–2	TJK; 0–2	BYE; 1	QAT; 2–0	3	3
14	Macau (MAC)	UZB; 0–2	BYE; 1	AFG; 0–2	QAT; 2–0	KAZ; 0–2	3	3
15	Qatar (QAT)	KAZ; 0–2	VIE; 0–2	BYE; 1	MAC; 0–2	THA; 0–2	1	1

===== Knockout round =====
Semifinals		Final
China	2
Philippines	0	China	1½
Iran	1½	Iran	½
India	½

==== Team rapid (U23) ====
===== Swiss round =====
25–26 September

Rank	Team	R1	R2	R3	R4	R5	GP	MP
1	Turkmenistan (TKM)	TJK; 1½–½	KAZ; 2–0	PHI; 1½–½	CHN; 1–1	IND; 1–1	7	8
2	China (CHN)	UZB; 1½–½	INA; 2–0	IRI; 1–1	TKM; 1–1	VIE; 1½–½	7	8
3	India (IND)	VIE; 2–0	PHI; 0–2	UZB; 2–0	IRI; 2–0	TKM; 1–1	7	7
4	Philippines (PHI)	QAT; 2–0	IND; 2–0	TKM ½–1½	VIE ½–1½	TJK; 1½–½	6½	6
5	Vietnam (VIE)	IND; 0–2	MAC; 2–0	INA; 2–0	PHI; 1½–½	CHN ½–1½	6	6
6	Iran (IRI)	JOR; 1–1	TJK; 2–0	CHN; 1–1	IND; 0–2	UZB; 1–1	5	5
7	Uzbekistan (UZB)	CHN ½–1½	JOR; 2–0	IND; 0–2	KAZ; 1½–½	IRI; 1–1	5	5
8	Indonesia (INA)	AFG; 2–0	CHN; 0–2	VIE; 0–2	JOR; 2–0	KAZ; 1–1	5	5
9	Kazakhstan (KAZ)	MAC; 1½–½	TKM; 0–2	QAT; 2–0	UZB ½–1½	INA; 1–1	5	5
10	Tajikistan (TJK)	TKM ½–1½	IRI; 0–2	MAC; 2–0	AFG; 2–0	PHI ½–1½	5	4
11	Jordan (JOR)	IRI; 1–1	UZB; 0–2	AFG; 1–1	INA; 0–2	QAT; 2–0	4	4
12	Afghanistan (AFG)	INA; 0–2	QAT; 1–1	JOR; 1–1	TJK; 0–2	MAC; 1½–½	3½	4
13	Qatar (QAT)	PHI; 0–2	AFG; 1–1	KAZ; 0–2	MAC; 1–1	JOR; 0–2	2	2
14	Macau (MAC)	KAZ ½–1½	VIE; 0–2	TJK; 0–2	QAT; 1–1	AFG ½–1½	2	1

===== Knockout round =====
26 September

Semifinals		Final
Turkmenistan	½
Philippines	1½	Philippines	0
China	1½	China	2
India	½

=== Women ===
==== Individual standard ====
21–24 September

Rank	Athlete	R1	R2	R3	R4	R5	R6	R7	Pts
1st place, gold medalist(s)	Tan Zhongyi (CHN)	TKM1; 1	IND1; 1	INA2; 1	CHN2; 1	KAZ2 ½	VIE1; 1	KAZ1 ½	6
2nd place, silver medalist(s)	Lei Tingjie (CHN)	PHI2; 1	VIE2; 1	QAT1; 1	CHN1; 0	INA1; 1	IRI2 ½	KAZ2; 1	5½
3rd place, bronze medalist(s)	Dinara Saduakassova (KAZ)	KGZ1; 1	IRI1 ½	INA1 ½	PHI1; 1	IND2 ½	SGP1; 1	CHN1 ½	5
4	Medina Warda Aulia (INA)	TJK1; 1	AFG1; 1	KAZ1 ½	UZB1; 1	CHN2; 0	IND2 ½	BAN1; 1	5
5	Hoàng Thị Bảo Trâm (VIE)	BAN2; 1	SGP1 ½	PHI1 ½	PHI2; 1	TKM2; 1	CHN1; 0	IND2; 1	5
6	Zhu Chen (QAT)	JOR2; 1	UZB2; 1	CHN2; 0	TKM2; 0	TJK2; 1	UZB1; 1	VIE2; 1	5
7	Subbaraman Vijayalakshmi (IND)	THA1; 1	CHN1; 0	BAN1; 0	UAE2; 1	KGZ2; 1	TKM2; 1	IRI2; 1	5
8	Zhansaya Abdumalik (KAZ)	JOR1; 1	PHI1 ½	SGP1; 1	BAN1; 1	CHN1 ½	VIE2 ½	CHN2; 0	4½
9	Võ Thị Kim Phụng (VIE)	SRI2; 1	CHN2; 0	SRI1; 1	TJK2; 1	INA2; 1	KAZ2 ½	QAT1; 0	4½
10	Mitra Hejazipour (IRI)	NEP1; 1 WO	KAZ1 ½	UZB1; 0	SGP1; 0	TJK1; 1	KGZ1; 1	TKM2; 1	4½
11	Tania Sachdev (IND)	KGZ2; 1	BAN1 ½	IRI2 ½	KGZ1; 1	KAZ1 ½	INA1 ½	VIE1; 0	4
12	Gong Qianyun (SGP)	UAE1; 1	VIE1 ½	KAZ2; 0	IRI1; 1	UZB2; 1	KAZ1; 0	PHI2 ½	4
13	Sara Khademalsharieh (IRI)	TJK2; 1	UZB1 ½	IND2 ½	UZB2 ½	TKM1; 1	CHN2 ½	IND1; 0	4
14	Shamima Akter Liza (BAN)	MDV1; 1	IND2 ½	IND1; 1	KAZ2; 0	UZB1 ½	INA2; 1	INA1; 0	4
15	Janelle Mae Frayna (PHI)	THA2; 1	KAZ2 ½	VIE1 ½	KAZ1; 0	JOR2; 1	PHI2 ½	UZB2 ½	4
16	Gulrukhbegim Tokhirjonova (UZB)	UAE2; 1	IRI2 ½	IRI1; 1	INA1; 0	BAN1 ½	QAT1; 0	KGZ2; 1	4
17	Shania Mae Mendoza (PHI)	CHN2; 0	TJK1; 1	AFG2; 1	VIE1; 0	SRI1; 1	PHI1 ½	SGP1 ½	4
18	Irene Kharisma Sukandar (INA)	SRI1; 1	TKM2; 1	CHN1; 0	KGZ2; 1	VIE2; 0	BAN1; 0	JOR1; 1	4
19	Nodira Nodirjanova (UZB)	MDV2; 1	QAT1; 0	JOR1; 1	IRI2 ½	SGP1; 0	TJK2; 1	PHI1 ½	4
20	Alexandra Samaganova (KGZ)	KAZ1; 0	SRI2; 1	AFG1; 1	IND2; 0	UAE1; 1	IRI1; 0	JOR2; 1	4
21	Bahar Hallaýewa (TKM)	CHN1; 0	THA1; 1	KGZ2; 0	MDV1; 1	IRI2; 0	THA2; 1	BAN2; 1	4
22	Mutriba Hotami (TJK)	INA1; 0	PHI2; 0	THA2 ½	THA1; 1	IRI1; 0	SRI2; 1	MDV2; 1	3½
23	Mähri Geldiýewa (TKM)	AFG2; 1	INA2; 0	BAN2; 1	QAT1; 1	VIE1; 0	IND1; 0	IRI1; 0	3
24	Diana Omurbekova (KGZ)	IND2; 0	MDV1; 1	TKM1; 1	INA2; 0	IND1; 0	UAE1; 1	UZB1; 0	3
25	Boshra Al-Shaeby (JOR)	KAZ2; 0	THA2; 1	UZB2; 0	UAE1; 0	SRI2; 1	SRI1; 1	INA2; 0	3
26	Sharmin Sultana Shirin (BAN)	VIE1; 0	UAE1; 1	TKM2; 0	SRI2 ½	THA2 ½	UAE2; 1	TKM1; 0	3
27	Ghayda Al-Attar (JOR)	QAT1; 0	UAE2; 0	NEP1; 1	AFG2; 1	PHI1; 0	MDV2; 1	KGZ1; 0	3
28	Wafia Al-Maamari (UAE)	SGP1; 0	BAN2; 0	THA1; 1	JOR1; 1	KGZ1; 0	KGZ2; 0	TJK2; 1	3
29	Wadima Al-Kalbani (UAE)	UZB1; 0	JOR2; 1	TJK2; 0	IND1; 0	MDV1; 1	BAN2; 0	NEP1; 1	3
30	Zainab Saumy (SRI)	INA2; 0	MDV2; 1	VIE2; 0	AFG1; 1	PHI2; 0	JOR1; 0	THA2; 1	3
31	Chanida Taweesupmun (THA)	IND1; 0	TKM1; 0	UAE1; 0	TJK1; 0	BYE; 1	AFG2; 1	MDV1; 1	3
32	Dasuni Hansika Mendis (SRI)	VIE2; 0	KGZ1; 0	MDV2; 1	BAN2 ½	JOR1; 0	TJK1; 0	BYE; 1	2½
33	Nadezhda Antonova (TJK)	IRI2; 0	NEP1; 1	UAE2; 1	VIE2; 0	QAT1; 0	UZB2; 0	UAE1; 0	2
34	Sarocha Chuemsakul (THA)	PHI1; 0	JOR1; 0	TJK1 ½	NEP1; 1 WO	BAN2 ½	TKM1; 0	SRI1; 0	2
35	Shahudha Mohamed (MDV)	BAN1; 0	KGZ2; 0	BYE; 1	TKM1; 0	UAE2; 0	AFG1; 1	THA1; 0	2
36	Nihaya Ahmed (MDV)	UZB2; 0	SRI1; 0	SRI2; 0	BYE; 1	AFG2; 1	JOR2; 0	TJK1; 0	2
37	Monalisa Khamboo (NEP)	IRI1; 0 WO	TJK2; 0	JOR2; 0	THA2; 0 WO	AFG1; 1	BYE; 1	UAE2; 0	2
38	Farahnaz Sadat (AFG)	BYE; 1	INA1; 0	KGZ1; 0	SRI1; 0	NEP1; 0	MDV1; 0	AFG2 ½	1½
39	Setareh Azizi (AFG)	TKM2; 0	BYE; 1	PHI2; 0	JOR2; 0	MDV2; 0	THA1; 0	AFG1 ½	1½

==== Team blitz ====
27 September

===== Swiss round =====
Rank	Team	R1	R2	R3	R4	R5	GP	MP
1	China (CHN)	KAZ; 2–0	IND; 1–1	UZB; 1½–½	VIE; 1½–½	IRI; 2–0	8	9
2	Vietnam (VIE)	TKM; 1–1	THA; 2–0	IND; 2–0	CHN ½–1½	INA; 2–0	7½	7
3	Turkmenistan (TKM)	VIE; 1–1	TJK; 1½–½	IRI; 1–1	IND; 1–1	KGZ; 1½–½	6	7
4	Uzbekistan (UZB)	TJK; 1–1	JOR; 2–0	CHN ½–1½	IRI ½–1½	IND; 2–0	6	5
5	Iran (IRI)	KGZ; 1½–½	INA; 1–1	TKM; 1–1	UZB; 1½–½	CHN; 0–2	5	6
6	Indonesia (INA)	JOR; 1–1	IRI; 1–1	TJK; 2–0	KGZ; 1–1	VIE; 0–2	5	5
7	Kyrgyzstan (KGZ)	IRI ½–1½	BAN; 1–1	KAZ; 2–0	INA; 1–1	TKM ½–1½	5	4
8	Tajikistan (TJK)	UZB; 1–1	TKM ½–1½	INA; 0–2	BYE; 1	THA; 2–0	4½	4
9	India (IND)	BAN; 2–0	CHN; 1–1	VIE; 0–2	TKM; 1–1	UZB; 0–2	4	4
10	Kazakhstan (KAZ)	CHN; 0–2	BYE; 1	KGZ; 0–2	THA; 2–0	JOR; 1–1	4	4
11	Jordan (JOR)	INA; 1–1	UZB; 0–2	BYE; 1	BAN; 1–1	KAZ; 1–1	4	4
12	Bangladesh (BAN)	IND; 0–2	KGZ; 1–1	THA; 1–1	JOR; 1–1	BYE; 1	4	4
13	Thailand (THA)	BYE; 1	VIE; 0–2	BAN; 1–1	KAZ; 0–2	TJK; 0–2	2	2

===== Knockout round =====
Semifinals		Final
China	2
Uzbekistan	0	China	2
Vietnam	1½	Vietnam	0
Turkmenistan	½

==== Team rapid ====
===== Swiss round =====
25–26 September

Rank	Team	R1	R2	R3	R4	R5	GP	MP
1	Indonesia (INA)	JOR; 2–0	KAZ; 1½–½	VIE; 2–0	CHN; 1½–½	IND; 1–1	8	9
2	China (CHN)	UZB; 2–0	IRI; 1½–½	IND; 2–0	INA ½–1½	KAZ; 1½–½	7½	8
3	Vietnam (VIE)	KGZ; 1½–½	UZB; 1½–½	INA; 0–2	BAN; 1½–½	TJK; 2–0	6½	8
4	India (IND)	BAN; 2–0	TKM; 2–0	CHN; 0–2	IRI; 1½–½	INA; 1–1	6½	7
5	Iran (IRI)	TJK; 2–0	CHN ½–1½	KAZ; 1–1	IND ½–1½	UZB; 1½–½	5½	5
6	Kazakhstan (KAZ)	THA; 2–0	INA ½–1½	IRI; 1–1	TKM; 1½–½	CHN ½–1½	5½	5
7	Turkmenistan (TKM)	AFG; 2–0	IND; 0–2	TJK; 1½–½	KAZ ½–1½	BAN; 1–1	5	5
8	Kyrgyzstan (KGZ)	VIE ½–1½	JOR; 1–1	BAN; 1½–½	TJK; 0–2	AFG; 2–0	5	5
9	Jordan (JOR)	INA; 0–2	KGZ; 1–1	UZB; 0–2	AFG; 2–0	THA; 2–0	5	5
10	Uzbekistan (UZB)	CHN; 0–2	VIE ½–1½	JOR; 2–0	THA; 1½–½	IRI ½–1½	4½	4
11	Tajikistan (TJK)	IRI; 0–2	THA; 2–0	TKM ½–1½	KGZ; 2–0	VIE; 0–2	4½	4
12	Bangladesh (BAN)	IND; 0–2	AFG; 2–0	KGZ ½–1½	VIE ½–1½	TKM; 1–1	4	3
13	Thailand (THA)	KAZ; 0–2	TJK; 0–2	AFG; 2–0	UZB ½–1½	JOR; 0–2	2½	2
14	Afghanistan (AFG)	TKM; 0–2	BAN; 0–2	THA; 0–2	JOR; 0–2	KGZ; 0–2	0	0

===== Knockout round =====
26 September

Semifinals		Final
Indonesia	2
India	0	Indonesia	½
China	2	China	1½
Vietnam	0

==== Team blitz (U23) ====
27 September

===== Swiss round =====
Rank	Team	R1	R2	R3	R4	R5	GP	MP
1	Kazakhstan (KAZ)	IND; 2–0	VIE; 1½–½	CHN; 1½–½	INA; 2–0	UZB; 2–0	9	10
2	China (CHN)	PHI; 2–0	UZB; 1–1	KAZ ½–1½	VIE; 2–0	IRI; 1–1	6½	6
3	Indonesia (INA)	SRI; 1–1	IRI; 2–0	TKM; 2–0	KAZ; 0–2	IND; 1–1	6	6
4	Iran (IRI)	TKM; 1–1	INA; 0–2	UAE; 2–0	SRI; 2–0	CHN; 1–1	6	6
5	India (IND)	KAZ; 0–2	UAE; 2–0	PHI; 1½–½	UZB; 1–1	INA; 1–1	5½	6
6	Vietnam (VIE)	UAE; 2–0	KAZ ½–1½	UZB; 1–1	CHN; 0–2	TKM; 2–0	5½	5
7	Philippines (PHI)	CHN; 0–2	SRI; 2–0	IND ½–1½	TKM; 1–1	THA; 2–0	5½	5
8	Uzbekistan (UZB)	THA; 2–0	CHN; 1–1	VIE; 1–1	IND; 1–1	KAZ; 0–2	5	5
9	Turkmenistan (TKM)	IRI; 1–1	MDV; 2–0 WO	INA; 0–2	PHI; 1–1	VIE; 0–2	4	4
10	Sri Lanka (SRI)	INA; 1–1	PHI; 0–2	THA; 2–0	IRI; 0–2	UAE; 1–1	4	4
11	United Arab Emirates (UAE)	VIE; 0–2	IND; 0–2	IRI; 0–2	THA; 2–0	SRI; 1–1	3	3
12	Maldives (MDV)	BYE; 1	TKM; 0–2 WO				1	1
13	Thailand (THA)	UZB; 0–2	BYE; 1	SRI; 0–2	UAE; 0–2	PHI; 0–2	1	1

===== Knockout round =====
Semifinals		Final
Kazakhstan	1
Iran	1	Iran	1 (1)
China	1	China	1 (0)
Indonesia	1

==== Team rapid (U23) ====
===== Swiss round =====
25–26 September

Rank	Team	R1	R2	R3	R4	R5	GP	MP
1	China (CHN)	TKM; 2–0	VIE; 1½–½	IRI; 1½–½	PHI; 2–0	IND; 2–0	9	10
2	Kazakhstan (KAZ)	PHI; 1½–½	IND; 1–1	UZB; 1–1	IRI; 2–0	VIE; 1½–½	7	8
3	Philippines (PHI)	KAZ ½–1½	INA; 2–0	TKM; 1½–½	CHN; 0–2	SRI; 2–0	6	6
4	Vietnam (VIE)	MDV; 2–0	CHN ½–1½	IND; 1–1	UZB; 2–0	KAZ ½–1½	6	5
5	India (IND)	INA; 1½–½	KAZ; 1–1	VIE; 1–1	TKM; 2–0	CHN; 0–2	5½	6
6	Iran (IRI)	UAE; 2–0	UZB; 1½–½	CHN ½–1½	KAZ; 0–2	INA; 1½–½	5½	6
7	Uzbekistan (UZB)	SRI; 2–0	IRI ½–1½	KAZ; 1–1	VIE; 0–2	MDV; 2–0	5½	5
8	Indonesia (INA)	IND ½–1½	PHI; 0–2	SRI; 2–0	UAE; 2–0	IRI ½–1½	5	4
9	Turkmenistan (TKM)	CHN; 0–2	MDV; 2–0	PHI ½–1½	IND; 0–2	UAE; 2–0	4½	4
10	Sri Lanka (SRI)	UZB; 0–2	UAE; 1½–½	INA; 0–2	MDV; 2–0	PHI; 0–2	3½	4
11	United Arab Emirates (UAE)	IRI; 0–2	SRI ½–1½	MDV; 2–0 WO	INA; 0–2	TKM; 0–2	2½	2
12	Maldives (MDV)	VIE; 0–2	TKM; 0–2	UAE; 0–2 WO	SRI; 0–2	UZB; 0–2	0	0

===== Knockout round =====
26 September

Semifinals		Final
China	2
Vietnam	0	China	½
Kazakhstan	2	Kazakhstan	1½
Philippines	0
