= Cue sports at the 2017 Asian Indoor and Martial Arts Games =

- Venue: Ashgabat Billiard Sports Arena
- Dates: 19–26 September 2017

Cue sports for the 2017 Asian Indoor and Martial Arts Games in Ashgabat, Turkmenistan was held at the Ashgabat Billiard Sports Arena. It took place from 19 to 26 September 2017.

== Medalists ==
=== Men ===
Event	Gold	Silver	Bronze
Three-cushion singles	Nguyễn Quốc Nguyện; Vietnam	Cho Jae-ho; South Korea	George Lteif; Lebanon
Three-cushion singles	Nguyễn Quốc Nguyện; Vietnam	Cho Jae-ho; South Korea	Trần Quyết Chiến; Vietnam
English billiards singles	Sourav Kothari; India	Praprut Chaithanasakun; Thailand	Trần Lê Anh Tuấn; Vietnam
English billiards singles	Sourav Kothari; India	Praprut Chaithanasakun; Thailand	Thawat Sujaritthurakarn; Thailand
Nine-ball singles	Chang Jung-lin; Chinese Taipei	Ko Pin-yi; Chinese Taipei	Tanut Makkamontree; Thailand
Nine-ball singles	Chang Jung-lin; Chinese Taipei	Ko Pin-yi; Chinese Taipei	Carlo Biado; Philippines
Nine-ball doubles	China; Lü Haotian; Liu Haitao	Chinese Taipei; Ko Pin-yi; Cheng Yu-hsuan	Iran; Mohammad Ali Pordel; Mehdi Rasekhi
Nine-ball doubles	China; Lü Haotian; Liu Haitao	Chinese Taipei; Ko Pin-yi; Cheng Yu-hsuan	Philippines; Warren Kiamco; Johann Chua
Russian pyramid free singles	Ibabekir Bekdurdyýew; Turkmenistan	Yernar Chimbayev; Kazakhstan	Annamämmet Annamämmedow; Turkmenistan
Russian pyramid free singles	Ibabekir Bekdurdyýew; Turkmenistan	Yernar Chimbayev; Kazakhstan	Begenç Aýdogdyýew; Turkmenistan
Russian pyramid dynamic singles	Annamämmet Annamämmedow; Turkmenistan	Kamaladdin Babaýew; Turkmenistan	Alikhan Karaneyev; Kazakhstan
Russian pyramid dynamic singles	Annamämmet Annamämmedow; Turkmenistan	Kamaladdin Babaýew; Turkmenistan	Batyr Geldiýew; Turkmenistan
Russian pyramid combined singles	Yzatbek Ratbekov; Kyrgyzstan	Alibek Omarov; Kazakhstan	Ibabekir Bekdurdyýew; Turkmenistan
Russian pyramid combined singles	Yzatbek Ratbekov; Kyrgyzstan	Alibek Omarov; Kazakhstan	Kanat Sydykov; Kyrgyzstan
Snooker singles	Zhao Xintong; China	Hossein Vafaei; Iran	Zhou Yuelong; China
Snooker singles	Zhao Xintong; China	Hossein Vafaei; Iran	Soheil Vahedi; Iran
Snooker team	Iran; Amir Sarkhosh; Hossein Vafaei; Soheil Vahedi	Qatar; Ali Al-Obaidly; Khamis Al-Obaidly; Ahmed Saif	China; Yan Bingtao; Zhao Xintong; Zhou Yuelong
Snooker team	Iran; Amir Sarkhosh; Hossein Vafaei; Soheil Vahedi	Qatar; Ali Al-Obaidly; Khamis Al-Obaidly; Ahmed Saif	Afghanistan; Zmaray Hasas; Saleh Mohammad; Mohammad Rais Senzahi
Six-red snooker singles	Yan Bingtao; China	Soheil Vahedi; Iran	Muhammad Sajjad; Pakistan
Six-red snooker singles	Yan Bingtao; China	Soheil Vahedi; Iran	Saleh Mohammad; Afghanistan

=== Women ===
Event	Gold	Silver	Bronze
Nine-ball singles	Han Yu; China	Chezka Centeno; Philippines	Liu Shasha; China
Nine-ball singles	Han Yu; China	Chezka Centeno; Philippines	Kim Ga-young; South Korea
Ten-ball singles	Chen Siming; China	Rubilen Amit; Philippines	Wei Tzu-chien; Chinese Taipei
Ten-ball singles	Chen Siming; China	Rubilen Amit; Philippines	Chou Chieh-yu; Chinese Taipei
Six-red snooker singles	Nutcharut Wongharuthai; Thailand	Waratthanun Sukritthanes; Thailand	Katrina Wan; Hong Kong
Six-red snooker singles	Nutcharut Wongharuthai; Thailand	Waratthanun Sukritthanes; Thailand	Ng On Yee; Hong Kong

== Medal table ==
Rank	Nation	Gold	Silver	Bronze	Total
1	China (CHN)	5	0	3	8
2	Turkmenistan (TKM)	2	1	4	7
3	Chinese Taipei (TPE)	1	2	2	5
3	Iran (IRI)	1	2	2	5
3	Thailand (THA)	1	2	2	5
6	Vietnam (VIE)	1	0	2	3
7	Kyrgyzstan (KGZ)	1	0	1	2
8	India (IND)	1	0	0	1
9	Philippines (PHI)	0	2	2	4
10	Kazakhstan (KAZ)	0	2	1	3
11	South Korea (KOR)	0	1	1	2
12	Qatar (QAT)	0	1	0	1
13	Afghanistan (AFG)	0	0	2	2
13	Hong Kong (HKG)	0	0	2	2
15	Lebanon (LBN)	0	0	1	1
15	Pakistan (PAK)	0	0	1	1
Totals (16 entries)		13	13	26	52

== Results ==
=== Men ===
==== Three-cushion singles ====
Round of 16; 19–21 September
Mashhour Abu Tayeh (JOR)	32
Aekravee Angkam (THA)	29
Annanur Sahatow (TKM)	3
Reynaldo Grandea (PHI)	40
George Lteif (LBN)	40
Kim Haeng-jik (KOR)	28
Cho Jae-ho (KOR)	40
Francisco dela Cruz (PHI)	37
Sompol Saetang (THA)	24
Jamal Suboh (JOR)	15
Batbayaryn Dorjsüren (MGL)	30
Begmyrat Bekmyradow (TKM)	26

Quarterfinals; 21–22 September
Nguyễn Quốc Nguyện (VIE)	40
Mashhour Abu Tayeh (JOR)	31
Reynaldo Grandea (PHI)	31
George Lteif (LBN)	40
Cho Jae-ho (KOR)	40
Sompol Saetang (THA)	14
Batbayaryn Dorjsüren (MGL)	11
Trần Quyết Chiến (VIE)	39

Semifinals; 23 September
Nguyễn Quốc Nguyện (VIE)	40
George Lteif (LBN)	29
Cho Jae-ho (KOR)	40
Trần Quyết Chiến (VIE)	34

Gold medal match 24 September
Nguyễn Quốc Nguyện (VIE)	40
Cho Jae-ho (KOR)	19

==== English billiards singles ====
Round of 32 – 20–21 September
Arsen Kalenbaev (KGZ)	WO	Ahmad Al-Okaily (JOR)
Soheil Vahedi (IRI)	1–3	Sourav Kothari (IND)

Round of 16; 21–22 September
Praprut Chaithanasakun (THA)	3
Arsen Kalenbaev (KGZ)	0
Hussain Fayaz (MDV)
Alok Kumar (IND)	WO
Süleýman Ilamanow (TKM)	0
Amir Sarkhosh (IRI)	3
Baek Min-hu (KOR)	1
Trần Lê Anh Tuấn (VIE)	3
Thawat Sujaritthurakarn (THA)	3
Ahusan Hashim (MDV)	0
Hwang Chul-ho (KOR)	3
Aziz Durdyýew (TKM)	0
Ahmad Naim (JOR)	0
Kanybek Sagynbaev (KGZ)	3
Sourav Kothari (IND)	3
Nguyễn Thanh Bình (VIE)	2

Quarterfinals; 22 September
Praprut Chaithanasakun (THA)	3
Alok Kumar (IND)	2
Amir Sarkhosh (IRI)	1
Trần Lê Anh Tuấn (VIE)	3
Thawat Sujaritthurakarn (THA)	3
Hwang Chul-ho (KOR)	1
Kanybek Sagynbaev (KGZ)	0
Sourav Kothari (IND)	3

Semifinals; 23 September
Praprut Chaithanasakun (THA)	3
Trần Lê Anh Tuấn (VIE)	1
Thawat Sujaritthurakarn (THA)	0
Sourav Kothari (IND)	3

Gold medal match 25 September
Praprut Chaithanasakun (THA)	1
Sourav Kothari (IND)	3

==== Nine-ball singles ====
Round of 64 – 19 September
Batbayaryn Dorjsüren (MGL)	2–9	Lee Jun-ho (KOR)
Zmaray Hasas (AFG)	4–9	Waleed Al-Ars (QAT)

Round of 32 – 19 September
Ko Pin-yi (TPE)	9–4	Lee Jun-ho (KOR)
Ruslanbek Karanow (TKM)	1–9	Ahmad Al-Okaily (JOR)
Omran Salem (UAE)	3–9	Liu Haitao (CHN)
Dennis Orcollo (PHI)	9–1	Nadir Rohani (AFG)
Mohamed Shareef (MDV)	1–9	Tanut Makkamontree (THA)
Robbie Capito (HKG)	8–9	Bashar Hussein (QAT)
Ali Maghsoud (IRI)	9–1	Arsen Kalenbaev (KGZ)
Mazen Berjaoui (LBN)	9–4	Ahmad Taufiq Murni (BRU)
Lo Ho Sum (HKG)	9–8	Mohammad Ali Pordel (IRI)
Ali Fayaz (MDV)	9–7	Kanybek Sagynbaev (KGZ)
Aung Moe Thu (MYA)	1–9	Amnuayporn Chotipong (THA)
Chang Jung-lin (TPE)	9–2	Dương Quốc Hoàng (VIE)
Serdar Meredow (TKM)	0–9	Ahmad Naim (JOR)
Mohamad Ali Berjaoui (LBN)	7–9	Salaheldeen Hussein (UAE)
Carlo Biado (PHI)	9–1	Jang Moon-seok (KOR)
Waleed Al-Ars (QAT)	WO	Lü Haotian (CHN)

Round of 16; 20 September
Ko Pin-yi (TPE)	9
Ahmad Al-Okaily (JOR)	4
Liu Haitao (CHN)	9
Dennis Orcollo (PHI)	6
Tanut Makkamontree (THA)	9
Bashar Hussein (QAT)	8
Ali Maghsoud (IRI)	9
Mazen Berjaoui (LBN)	2
Lo Ho Sum (HKG)	9
Ali Fayaz (MDV)	3
Amnuayporn Chotipong (THA)	6
Chang Jung-lin (TPE)	9
Ahmad Naim (JOR)	9
Salaheldeen Hussein (UAE)	5
Carlo Biado (PHI)	9
Waleed Al-Ars (QAT)	6

Quarterfinals; 21 September
Ko Pin-yi (TPE)	9
Liu Haitao (CHN)	6
Tanut Makkamontree (THA)	9
Ali Maghsoud (IRI)	6
Lo Ho Sum (HKG)	6
Chang Jung-lin (TPE)	9
Ahmad Naim (JOR)	2
Carlo Biado (PHI)	9

Semifinals; 21 September
Ko Pin-yi (TPE)	9
Tanut Makkamontree (THA)	8
Chang Jung-lin (TPE)	9
Carlo Biado (PHI)	2

Gold medal match 22 September
Ko Pin-yi (TPE)	8
Chang Jung-lin (TPE)	9

==== Nine-ball doubles ====
Round of 16; 23 September
Ahmad Naim (JOR); Mohammad Ghaleb (JOR)	7
Bashar Hussein (QAT); Waleed Al-Ars (QAT)	9
Mohammad Ali Pordel (IRI); Mehdi Rasekhi (IRI)	9
Hussain Fayaz (MDV); Hassan Shaz Mohamed (MDV)	2
Tanut Makkamontree (THA); Amnuayporn Chotipong (THA)	2
Omran Salem (UAE); Salaheldeen Hussein (UAE)	9
Lü Haotian (CHN); Liu Haitao (CHN)	9
Nadir Rohani (AFG); Zmaray Hasas (AFG)	3
Lee Jun-ho (KOR); Jang Moon-seok (KOR)	9
Serdar Meredow (TKM); Ruslanbek Karanow (TKM)	2
Andrew Kong (HKG); Lo Ho Sum (HKG)	9
Aung Moe Thu (MYA); Ko Htet (MYA)	4
Mohamad Ali Berjaoui (LBN); Mazen Berjaoui (LBN)	2
Warren Kiamco (PHI); Johann Chua (PHI)	9

Quarterfinals; 23 September
Ko Pin-yi (TPE); Cheng Yu-hsuan (TPE)	9
Bashar Hussein (QAT); Waleed Al-Ars (QAT)	2
Mohammad Ali Pordel (IRI); Mehdi Rasekhi (IRI)	9
Omran Salem (UAE); Salaheldeen Hussein (UAE)	3
Lü Haotian (CHN); Liu Haitao (CHN)	9
Lee Jun-ho (KOR); Jang Moon-seok (KOR)	1
Andrew Kong (HKG); Lo Ho Sum (HKG)	8
Warren Kiamco (PHI); Johann Chua (PHI)	9

Semifinals; 24 September
Ko Pin-yi (TPE); Cheng Yu-hsuan (TPE)	9
Mohammad Ali Pordel (IRI); Mehdi Rasekhi (IRI)	3
Lü Haotian (CHN); Liu Haitao (CHN)	9
Warren Kiamco (PHI); Johann Chua (PHI)	6

Gold medal match 25 September
Ko Pin-yi (TPE); Cheng Yu-hsuan (TPE)	7
Lü Haotian (CHN); Liu Haitao (CHN)	9

==== Russian pyramid free singles ====
Round of 16; 19 September
Dastan Lepshakov (KGZ)	5
Francisco Bustamante (PHI)	1
Efren Reyes (PHI)	5
Yuttapop Pakpoj (THA)	1

Quarterfinals; 19 September
Yernar Chimbayev (KAZ)	5
Dastan Lepshakov (KGZ)	1
Annamämmet Annamämmedow (TKM)	5
Arbi Mutsiyev (KAZ)	3
Begenç Aýdogdyýew (TKM)	5
Efren Reyes (PHI)	3
Ibabekir Bekdurdyýew (TKM)	5
Batyr Geldiýew (TKM)	2

Semifinals; 20 September
Yernar Chimbayev (KAZ)	5
Annamämmet Annamämmedow (TKM)	2
Begenç Aýdogdyýew (TKM)	2
Ibabekir Bekdurdyýew (TKM)	5

Gold medal match 20 September
Yernar Chimbayev (KAZ)	1
Ibabekir Bekdurdyýew (TKM)	5

==== Russian pyramid dynamic singles ====
Round of 16; 21 September
Francisco Bustamante (PHI)	5
Sompol Saetang (THA)	1
Alikhan Karaneyev (KAZ)	5
Kanybek Sagynbaev (KGZ)	2
Dastan Lepshakov (KGZ)	2
Kamaladdin Babaýew (TKM)	5
Efren Reyes (PHI)	5
Aekravee Angkam (THA)	4

Quarterfinals; 21 September
Annamämmet Annamämmedow (TKM)	5
Francisco Bustamante (PHI)	0
Alikhan Karaneyev (KAZ)	5
Serdar Myratberdiýew (TKM)	3
Dauren Urynbayev (KAZ)	2
Kamaladdin Babaýew (TKM)	5
Efren Reyes (PHI)	1
Batyr Geldiýew (TKM)	5

Semifinals; 22 September
Annamämmet Annamämmedow (TKM)	5
Alikhan Karaneyev (KAZ)	2
Kamaladdin Babaýew (TKM)	5
Batyr Geldiýew (TKM)	4

Gold medal match 22 September
Annamämmet Annamämmedow (TKM)	5
Kamaladdin Babaýew (TKM)	4

==== Russian pyramid combined singles ====
Round of 16; 23 September
Yzatbek Ratbekov (KGZ)	5
Alikhan Karaneyev (KAZ)	2
Begenç Jumagylyjow (TKM)	5
Francisco Bustamante (PHI)	0
Şamuhammet Täşliýew (TKM)	5
Yuttapop Pakpoj (THA)	0

Quarterfinals; 24 September
Ibabekir Bekdurdyýew (TKM)	5
Efren Reyes (PHI)	3
Yzatbek Ratbekov (KGZ)	5
Annamämmet Annamämmedow (TKM)	2
Kanat Sydykov (KGZ)	5
Begenç Jumagylyjow (TKM)	2
Şamuhammet Täşliýew (TKM)	2
Alibek Omarov (KAZ)	5

Semifinals; 25 September
Ibabekir Bekdurdyýew (TKM)	2
Yzatbek Ratbekov (KGZ)	5
Kanat Sydykov (KGZ)	2
Alibek Omarov (KAZ)	5

Gold medal match 26 September
Yzatbek Ratbekov (KGZ)	5
Alibek Omarov (KAZ)	1

==== Snooker singles ====
Round of 32 – 24 September
Ahusan Hashim (MDV)	0–4	Oliver Tam (HKG)
Moath Al-Majali (JOR)	4–0	Kim Young-joo (KOR)
Ali Al-Obaidly (QAT)	1–4	Ko Htet (MYA)
Issara Kachaiwong (THA)	4–1	Muhammad Sajjad (PAK)
Hossein Vafaei (IRI)	4–0	Süleýman Ilamanow (TKM)
Jefrey Roda (PHI)	3–4	Sundeep Gulati (IND)
Mohammed Al-Jokar (UAE)	2–4	Saleh Mohammad (AFG)
Kamal Chawla (IND)	4–2	Thanawat Thirapongpaiboon (THA)
Khalid Al-Kamali (UAE)	WO	Ibrahim Haneef (MDV)
Kamaladdin Babaýew (TKM)	0–4	Lee Dae-gyu (KOR)
Soheil Vahedi (IRI)	4–0	Cheung Ka Wai (HKG)
Ahmed Saif (QAT)	4–2	Shakirzhan Fazylov (KAZ)
Basil Al-Shajjar (PHI)	3–4	Asjad Iqbal (PAK)
Mohammad Rais Senzahi (AFG)	4–2	Sharaf Al-Maaitah (JOR)

Round of 16; 24 September
Zhou Yuelong (CHN)	4
Oliver Tam (HKG)	1
Moath Al-Majali (JOR)	2
Ko Htet (MYA)	4
Issara Kachaiwong (THA)	0
Hossein Vafaei (IRI)	4
Sundeep Gulati (IND)	1
Saleh Mohammad (AFG)	4
Kamal Chawla (IND)	4
Ibrahim Haneef (MDV)	0
Lee Dae-gyu (KOR)	3
Soheil Vahedi (IRI)	4
Ahmed Saif (QAT)	1
Asjad Iqbal (PAK)	4
Mohammad Rais Senzahi (AFG)	3
Zhao Xintong (CHN)	4

Quarterfinals; 25 September
Zhou Yuelong (CHN)	4
Ko Htet (MYA)	1
Hossein Vafaei (IRI)	4
Saleh Mohammad (AFG)	2
Kamal Chawla (IND)	3
Soheil Vahedi (IRI)	4
Asjad Iqbal (PAK)	1
Zhao Xintong (CHN)	4

Semifinals; 26 September
Zhou Yuelong (CHN)	3
Hossein Vafaei (IRI)	4
Soheil Vahedi (IRI)	2
Zhao Xintong (CHN)	4

Gold medal match 26 September
Hossein Vafaei (IRI)	2
Zhao Xintong (CHN)	4

==== Snooker team ====
Round of 16; 22 September
Pakistan	1
Myanmar	3
Qatar	3
Turkmenistan	0
Jordan	1
Thailand	3
Afghanistan	3
United Arab Emirates	1
Philippines	0
Hong Kong	3
Iran	3
South Korea	0

Quarterfinals; 23 September
China	WO
Myanmar
Qatar	3
Thailand	2
Afghanistan	3
Hong Kong	1
Iran	3
India	2

Semifinals; 23 September
China	1
Qatar	3
Afghanistan	1
Iran	3

Gold medal match 24 September
Qatar	0
Iran	3

==== Six-red snooker singles ====
Round of 32 – 19 September
Mohammad Rais Senzahi (AFG)	5–2	Jefrey Roda (PHI)
Kamal Chawla (IND)	5–0	Abdulrahman Al-Shamsi (UAE)
Ko Htet (MYA)	5–4	Phaitoon Phonbun (THA)
Muhammad Sajjad (PAK)	5–4	Sharaf Al-Maaitah (JOR)
Alan Lin (HKG)	5–0	Amir Sarkhosh (IRI)
Süleýman Ilamanow (TKM)	1–5	Lee Dae-gyu (KOR)
Mohammed Al-Jokar (UAE)	3–5	Ahmed Saif (QAT)
Basil Al-Shajjar (PHI)	5–3	Kim Young-joo (KOR)
Saleh Mohammad (AFG)	5–4	Moath Al-Majali (JOR)
Aziz Durdyýew (TKM)	1–5	Issara Kachaiwong (THA)
Lü Haotian (CHN)	5–0	Chau Hon Man (HKG)
Muhammad Bilal (PAK)	5–0	Nguyễn Thanh Bình (VIE)

Round of 16; 20 September
Yan Bingtao (CHN)	5
Mohammad Rais Senzahi (AFG)	1
Kamal Chawla (IND)	5
Ko Htet (MYA)	2
Muhammad Sajjad (PAK)	5
Alan Lin (HKG)	4
Lee Dae-gyu (KOR)	4
Ali Al-Obaidly (QAT)	5
Sundeep Gulati (IND)	5
Ahmed Saif (QAT)	4
Basil Al-Shajjar (PHI)	1
Saleh Mohammad (AFG)	5
Issara Kachaiwong (THA)	1
Lü Haotian (CHN)	5
Muhammad Bilal (PAK)	1
Soheil Vahedi (IRI)	5

Quarterfinals; 20 September
Yan Bingtao (CHN)	5
Kamal Chawla (IND)	1
Muhammad Sajjad (PAK)	5
Ali Al-Obaidly (QAT)	3
Sundeep Gulati (IND)	3
Saleh Mohammad (AFG)	5
Lü Haotian (CHN)	1
Soheil Vahedi (IRI)	5

Semifinals; 21 September
Yan Bingtao (CHN)	5
Muhammad Sajjad (PAK)	3
Saleh Mohammad (AFG)	2
Soheil Vahedi (IRI)	5

Gold medal match 21 September
Yan Bingtao (CHN)	5
Soheil Vahedi (IRI)	1

=== Women ===
==== Nine-ball singles ====
Round of 16; 20 September
Aminath Fathy (MDV)	0
Liu Shasha (CHN)	7
Pennipa Nakjui (THA)	3
Chezka Centeno (PHI)	7
Akram Mohammadi (IRI)	1
Chen Ho-yun (TPE)	7
Kim Ga-young (KOR)	7
Vutthiphan Kongkaket (THA)	0
Rubilen Amit (PHI)	7
Huỳnh Thị Ngọc Huyền (VIE)	3
Parisa Mangli (IRI)	1
Han Yu (CHN)	7
Aminath Azra (MDV)	0
Chou Chieh-yu (TPE)	7

Quarterfinals; 21 September
Lim Yun-mi (KOR)	3
Liu Shasha (CHN)	7
Chezka Centeno (PHI)	7
Chen Ho-yun (TPE)	3
Kim Ga-young (KOR)	7
Rubilen Amit (PHI)	5
Han Yu (CHN)	7
Chou Chieh-yu (TPE)	3

Semifinals; 21 September
Liu Shasha (CHN)	3
Chezka Centeno (PHI)	7
Kim Ga-young (KOR)	3
Han Yu (CHN)	7

Gold medal match 22 September
Chezka Centeno (PHI)	4
Han Yu (CHN)	7

==== Ten-ball singles ====
Round of 16; 24 September
Wei Tzu-chien (TPE)	7
Vutthiphan Kongkaket (THA)	1
Aminath Azra (MDV)	3
Parisa Mangli (IRI)	7
Huỳnh Thị Ngọc Huyền (VIE)	2
Rubilen Amit (PHI)	7
Chen Siming (CHN)	7
Chezka Centeno (PHI)	1
Aminath Fathy (MDV)	2
Pennipa Nakjui (THA)	7
Kim Ga-young (KOR)	7
Akram Mohammadi (IRI)	1

Quarterfinals; 25 September
Lim Yun-mi (KOR)	2
Wei Tzu-chien (TPE)	7
Parisa Mangli (IRI)	1
Rubilen Amit (PHI)	7
Chen Siming (CHN)	7
Pennipa Nakjui (THA)	1
Kim Ga-young (KOR)	5
Chou Chieh-yu (TPE)	7

Semifinals; 25 September
Wei Tzu-chien (TPE)	3
Rubilen Amit (PHI)	7
Chen Siming (CHN)	7
Chou Chieh-yu (TPE)	5

Gold medal match 26 September
Rubilen Amit (PHI)	5
Chen Siming (CHN)	7

==== Six-red snooker singles ====
Round of 16; 21 September
Floriza Andal (PHI)	4
Park Jeong-min (KOR)	0
Wang Xiaotong (CHN)	4
Chitra Magimairaj (IND)	1
Akram Mohammadi (IRI)	1
Katrina Wan (HKG)	4
Waratthanun Sukritthanes (THA)	4
Choi Hye-min (KOR)	0
Bai Ge (CHN)	1
Iris Ranola (PHI)	4

Quarterfinals; 22 September
Nutcharut Wongharuthai (THA)	4
Floriza Andal (PHI)	2
Wang Xiaotong (CHN)	3
Katrina Wan (HKG)	4
Waratthanun Sukritthanes (THA)	4
Vidya Pillai (IND)	1
Iris Ranola (PHI)	2
Ng On Yee (HKG)	4

Semifinals; 23 September
Nutcharut Wongharuthai (THA)	4
Katrina Wan (HKG)	1
Waratthanun Sukritthanes (THA)	4
Ng On Yee (HKG)	2

Gold medal match 23 September
Nutcharut Wongharuthai (THA)	4
Waratthanun Sukritthanes (THA)	0
