= Bowling at the 2017 Asian Indoor and Martial Arts Games =

- Venue: Ashgabat Bowling Centre
- Dates: 21–27 September 2017

Bowling at the 2017 Asian Indoor and Martial Arts Games was held in Ashgabat, Turkmenistan from 21 to 27 September 2017 at the Bowling Center.

== Medalists ==
=== Men ===
Event	Gold	Silver	Bronze
Singles	Annop Arromsaranon; Thailand	Kenneth Chua; Philippines	Ivan Tse; Hong Kong
Singles	Annop Arromsaranon; Thailand	Kenneth Chua; Philippines	Wu Hao-ming; Chinese Taipei
Doubles	South Korea; Kang Hee-won; Cho Young-seon	South Korea; Choi Bok-eum; Kim Kyung-min	Hong Kong; Michael Mak; Wu Siu Hong
Doubles	South Korea; Kang Hee-won; Cho Young-seon	South Korea; Choi Bok-eum; Kim Kyung-min	India; Shabbir Dhankot; Dhruv Sarda
Team of 4	Chinese Taipei; Wu Hao-ming; Chen Chia-hsing; Tsai Ying-hao; Teng Jui-pu	Qatar; Jassim Al-Merikhi; Ghanim Aboujassoum; Yousef Al-Jaber; Saoud Ahmad Abdulla	Indonesia; Hardy Rachmadian; Fachri Ibnu Askar; Billy Muhammad Islam; Diwan Rezaldy
Team of 4	Chinese Taipei; Wu Hao-ming; Chen Chia-hsing; Tsai Ying-hao; Teng Jui-pu	Qatar; Jassim Al-Merikhi; Ghanim Aboujassoum; Yousef Al-Jaber; Saoud Ahmad Abdulla	South Korea; Choi Bok-eum; Kang Hee-won; Kim Kyung-min; Cho Young-seon

=== Women ===
Event	Gold	Silver	Bronze
Singles	Baek Seung-ja; South Korea	Tannya Roumimper; Indonesia	Zhang Yuhong; China
Singles	Baek Seung-ja; South Korea	Tannya Roumimper; Indonesia	Natthida Sertluecha; Thailand
Doubles	China; Zhang Yuhong; Zhang Chunli	South Korea; Baek Seung-ja; Hong Hae-ni	Chinese Taipei; Pan Yu-fen; Wang Ya-ting
Doubles	China; Zhang Yuhong; Zhang Chunli	South Korea; Baek Seung-ja; Hong Hae-ni	South Korea; Kim Moon-jeong; Jung Da-wun
Team of 4	South Korea; Kim Moon-jeong; Jung Da-wun; Baek Seung-ja; Hong Hae-ni	Philippines; Liza del Rosario; Alexis Sy; Krizziah Tabora; Lara Posadas	Chinese Taipei; Wang Ting-wen; Pan Yu-fen; Lin Ting-yu; Wang Ya-ting
Team of 4	South Korea; Kim Moon-jeong; Jung Da-wun; Baek Seung-ja; Hong Hae-ni	Philippines; Liza del Rosario; Alexis Sy; Krizziah Tabora; Lara Posadas	China; Zhang Yuhong; Peng Rui; Yang Liyan; Zhang Chunli

== Medal table ==
Rank	Nation	Gold	Silver	Bronze	Total
1	South Korea (KOR)	3	2	2	7
2	Chinese Taipei (TPE)	1	0	3	4
3	China (CHN)	1	0	2	3
4	Thailand (THA)	1	0	1	2
5	Philippines (PHI)	0	2	0	2
6	Indonesia (INA)	0	1	1	2
7	Qatar (QAT)	0	1	0	1
8	Hong Kong (HKG)	0	0	2	2
9	India (IND)	0	0	1	1
Totals (9 entries)		6	6	12	24

== Results ==
=== Men ===
==== Singles ====
21 September

===== Preliminary =====
Rank	Athlete	Score
1	Wang Zhiyong (CHN)	1443
2	Kang Hee-won (KOR)	1437
3	Kim Kyung-min (KOR)	1420
4	Wu Hao-ming (TPE)	1387
5	Wang Hongbo (CHN)	1379
6	Ivan Tse (HKG)	1378
7	Kenneth Chua (PHI)	1374
8	Choi Bok-eum (KOR)	1362
9	Cho Young-seon (KOR)	1361
10	Annop Arromsaranon (THA)	1354
11	Kim Bolleby (THA)	1350
12	Shabbir Dhankot (IND)	1342
13	Billy Muhammad Islam (INA)	1329
14	Dhruv Sarda (IND)	1326
15	Jomar Jumapao (PHI)	1322
16	Yannaphon Larpapharat (THA)	1314
17	Mahmood Al-Attar (UAE)	1307
18	Shaker Ali Al-Hassan (UAE)	1306
19	Michael Mak (HKG)	1303
19	Wong Kwan Yuen (HKG)	1303
21	Jay Leon Guerrero (GUM)	1299
22	Abdulrahman Al-Kheliwi (KSA)	1288
23	Akaash Ashok Kumar (IND)	1283
24	Ghanim Aboujassoum (QAT)	1270
25	Hardy Rachmadian (INA)	1266
26	Yang Wei (CHN)	1263
27	Fazliddin Mirjalilov (UZB)	1257
28	Lee Tak Man (MAC)	1250
29	Chen Chia-hsing (TPE)	1249
30	Wu Siu Hong (HKG)	1247
31	Zhang Min (CHN)	1235
32	Bakhtiyor Dalabaev (UZB)	1233
33	Mohammed Al-Saud (KSA)	1226
33	Sithiphol Kunaksorn (THA)	1226
35	Ray San Nicolas (GUM)	1220
36	Tsai Ying-hao (TPE)	1208
37	Parvez Ahmed Saud (IND)	1205
38	Yousef Al-Jaber (QAT)	1204
39	Abdullah Al-Dolijan (KSA)	1203
39	Diwan Rezaldy (INA)	1203
41	Anton Alcazaren (PHI)	1182
42	Ivan Malig (PHI)	1173
43	Ho Weng Hou (MAC)	1171
44	Teng Jui-pu (TPE)	1167
45	Saoud Ahmad Abdulla (QAT)	1163
46	Olim Mukhtorov (UZB)	1153
47	Jassim Al-Merikhi (QAT)	1151
48	Phạm Gia Phú (VIE)	1150
49	Adel Al-Bariqi (KSA)	1139
50	Gregory Borja (GUM)	1138
51	Vũ Hữu Chiến (VIE)	1131
52	Ebrahim Oushani (IRI)	1120
53	Ravshan Abdusamadov (UZB)	1107
54	Fachri Ibnu Askar (INA)	1105
55	Michael Gadia (GUM)	1100
56	Lei Hok Hin (MAC)	1093
57	Chan Tak Seng (MAC)	1075
58	Han Hangeldiýew (TKM)	1031
59	Roger Ruiz (NCL)	1011
60	Begençmyrat Muhammetgylyjow (TKM)	973
61	Nguyễn Văn Hoàng (VIE)	964
62	Geldi Garaýew (TKM)	963
63	Serdar Ataýew (TKM)	864
—	Bagher Ahmadi (IRI)	DNF

===== Knockout round =====
Quarterfinals		Semifinals		Final
Kim Kyung-min (KOR)	236
Ivan Tse (HKG)	267	Ivan Tse (HKG)	228
Kang Hee-won (KOR)	180	Kenneth Chua (PHI)	264
Kenneth Chua (PHI)	218			Kenneth Chua (PHI)	212
Wu Hao-ming (TPE)	213			Annop Arromsaranon (THA)	247
Wang Hongbo (CHN)	192	Wu Hao-ming (TPE)	184
Wang Zhiyong (CHN)	160	Annop Arromsaranon (THA)	226
Annop Arromsaranon (THA)	217

==== Doubles ====
23 September

===== Preliminary =====
Rank	Team	Score
1	South Korea (KOR); Choi Bok-eum; Kim Kyung-min	2847
2	South Korea (KOR); Kang Hee-won; Cho Young-seo	2783
3	Indonesia (INA); Hardy Rachmadian; Billy Muhammad Islam	2743
4	Philippines (PHI); Jomar Jumapao; Kenneth Chua	2662
5	India (IND); Shabbir Dhankot; Dhruv Sarda	2570
6	Hong Kong (HKG); Michael Mak; Wu Siu Hong	2507
7	Qatar (QAT); Jassim Al-Merikhi; Ghanim Aboujassoum	2504
8	Indonesia (INA); Diwan Rezaldy; Fachri Ibnu Askar	2500
9	Chinese Taipei (TPE); Tsai Ying-hao; Teng Jui-pu	2496
9	Thailand (THA); Yannaphon Larpapharat; Kim Bolleby	2496
11	Chinese Taipei (TPE); Chen Chia-hsing; Wu Hao-ming	2487
12	Saudi Arabia (KSA); Mohammed Al-Saud; Adel Al-Bariqi	2470
13	Thailand (THA); Annop Arromsaranon; Sithiphol Kunaksorn	2444
14	China (CHN); Wang Zhiyong; Wang Hongbo	2439
15	Guam (GUM); Jay Leon Guerrero; Ray San Nicolas	2430
16	United Arab Emirates (UAE); Shaker Ali Al-Hassan; Mahmood Al-Attar	2386
17	India (IND); Akaash Ashok Kumar; Parvez Ahmed Saud	2380
18	Macau (MAC); Ho Weng Hou; Lee Tak Man	2377
19	China (CHN); Zhang Min; Yang Wei	2371
20	Saudi Arabia (KSA); Abdullah Al-Dolijan; Abdulrahman Al-Kheliwi	2368
21	Uzbekistan (UZB); Fazliddin Mirjalilov; Bakhtiyor Dalabaev	2292
22	Hong Kong (HKG); Wong Kwan Yuen; Ivan Tse	2291
23	Macau (MAC); Chan Tak Seng; Lei Hok Hin	2247
24	Qatar (QAT); Yousef Al-Jaber; Saoud Ahmad Abdulla	2230
25	Vietnam (VIE); Vũ Hữu Chiến; Phạm Gia Phú	2188
26	Guam (GUM); Gregory Borja; Michael Gadia	2184
27	Philippines (PHI); Anton Alcazaren; Ivan Malig	2162
28	Turkmenistan (TKM); Geldi Garaýew; Han Hangeldiýew	2158
29	Uzbekistan (UZB); Olim Mukhtorov; Ravshan Abdusamadov	2156
30	Iran (IRI); Bagher Ahmadi; Ebrahim Oushani	2155
31	Turkmenistan (TKM); Begençmyrat Muhammetgylyjow; Serdar Ataýew	1950

===== Knockout round =====
Quarterfinals		Semifinals		Final
Choi Bok-eum (KOR); Kim Kyung-min (KOR)	484
Diwan Rezaldy (INA); Fachri Ibnu Askar (INA)	342	Choi Bok-eum (KOR); Kim Kyung-min (KOR)	449
Hardy Rachmadian (INA); Billy Muhammad Islam (INA)	415	Michael Mak (HKG); Wu Siu Hong (HKG)	396
Michael Mak (HKG); Wu Siu Hong (HKG)	416			Choi Bok-eum (KOR); Kim Kyung-min (KOR)	383
Kang Hee-won (KOR); Cho Young-seon (KOR)	389			Kang Hee-won (KOR); Cho Young-seon (KOR)	434
Jassim Al-Merikhi (QAT); Ghanim Aboujassoum (QAT)	381	Kang Hee-won (KOR); Cho Young-seon (KOR)	458
Jomar Jumapao (PHI); Kenneth Chua (PHI)	406	Shabbir Dhankot (IND); Dhruv Sarda (IND)	365
Shabbir Dhankot (IND); Dhruv Sarda (IND)	418

==== Team of 4 ====
===== Preliminary =====
25 September

Rank	Team	Score
1	South Korea (KOR)	5443
2	Indonesia (INA)	5280
3	Chinese Taipei (TPE)	5116
4	Qatar (QAT)	5111
5	Thailand (THA)	5063
6	China (CHN)	5021
7	Hong Kong (HKG)	4997
8	Philippines (PHI)	4991
9	India (IND)	4963
10	Macau (MAC)	4785
11	Saudi Arabia (KSA)	4601
12	Guam (GUM)	4566
13	Uzbekistan (UZB)	4430
14	Turkmenistan (TKM)	4117

===== Knockout round =====
Semifinals; 26 September		Final; 27 September
Indonesia	730
Chinese Taipei	784	Chinese Taipei	846
South Korea	802	Qatar	744
Qatar	827

=== Women ===
==== Singles ====
22 September

===== Preliminary =====
Rank	Athlete	Score
1	Baek Seung-ja (KOR)	1455
2	Angkana Netrviseth (THA)	1333
3	Jung Da-wun (KOR)	1330
4	Tannya Roumimper (INA)	1318
5	Liza del Rosario (PHI)	1317
6	Natthida Sertluecha (THA)	1298
7	Zhang Yuhong (CHN)	1267
8	Alisha Nabila Larasati (INA)	1264
9	Peng Rui (CHN)	1256
10	Alexis Sy (PHI)	1241
10	Lara Posadas (PHI)	1241
12	Pan Yu-fen (TPE)	1240
13	Krizziah Tabora (PHI)	1233
14	Wang Ya-ting (TPE)	1232
15	Yanee Saebe (THA)	1225
16	Kim Moon-jeong (KOR)	1215
17	Aldila Indryati (INA)	1198
18	Yang Liyan (CHN)	1195
19	Wang Ting-wen (TPE)	1191
20	Tanaprang Sathean (THA)	1190
21	Milki Ng (HKG)	1176
22	Chan Shuk Han (HKG)	1171
23	Hui Tong (MAC)	1158
24	Wong Son Ian (MAC)	1151
25	Hong Hae-ni (KOR)	1149
26	Zhang Chunli (CHN)	1148
27	Lin Ting-yu (TPE)	1101
28	Tatyana Lefter (UZB)	1088
29	Filomena Choi (MAC)	1085
30	Nadia Pramanik Nuramalina (INA)	1068
31	Elena Kasymova (UZB)	1049
32	Zoe Tam (HKG)	1027
33	Hüýrbibi Kişikowa (TKM)	1017
34	Joan Cheng (HKG)	1008
35	Ýelena Bäşimowa (TKM)	946
36	Roza Jumabaýewa (TKM)	897
37	Nasiba Orazmedowa (TKM)	896
38	Falakika Takatai (NCL)	895

===== Knockout round =====
Quarterfinals		Semifinals		Final
Baek Seung-ja (KOR)	258
Alisha Nabila Larasati (INA)	157	Baek Seung-ja (KOR)	213
Angkana Netrviseth (THA)	182	Zhang Yuhong (CHN)	204
Zhang Yuhong (CHN)	205			Baek Seung-ja (KOR)	210
Tannya Roumimper (INA)	204			Tannya Roumimper (INA)	161
Liza del Rosario (PHI)	194	Tannya Roumimper (INA)	257
Jung Da-wun (KOR)	218	Natthida Sertluecha (THA)	174
Natthida Sertluecha (THA)	247

==== Doubles ====
24 September

===== Preliminary =====
Rank	Team	Score
1	South Korea (KOR); Kim Moon-jeong; Jung Da-wun	2610
2	Chinese Taipei (TPE); Pan Yu-fen; Wang Ya-ting	2537
3	China (CHN); Zhang Yuhong; Zhang Chunli	2495
4	South Korea (KOR); Baek Seung-ja; Hong Hae-ni	2439
5	Hong Kong (HKG); Milki Ng; Chan Shuk Han	2437
6	Indonesia (INA); Aldila Indryati; Tannya Roumimper	2418
7	Philippines (PHI); Liza del Rosario; Krizziah Tabora	2387
8	Philippines (PHI); Alexis Sy; Lara Posadas	2349
9	China (CHN); Peng Rui; Yang Liyan	2323
10	Indonesia (INA); Alisha Nabila Larasati; Nadia Pramanik Nuramalina	2306
11	Chinese Taipei (TPE); Wang Ting-wen; Lin Ting-yu	2305
12	Thailand (THA); Angkana Netrviseth; Yanee Saebe	2286
13	Hong Kong (HKG); Joan Cheng; Zoe Tam	2238
14	Thailand (THA); Natthida Sertluecha; Tanaprang Sathean	2214
15	Macau (MAC); Wong Son Ian; Hui Tong	2201
16	Uzbekistan (UZB); Elena Kasymova; Tatyana Lefter	2111
17	Turkmenistan (TKM); Ýelena Bäşimowa; Roza Jumabaýewa	1863
18	Turkmenistan (TKM); Hüýrbibi Kişikowa; Nasiba Orazmedowa	1827

===== Knockout round =====
Quarterfinals		Semifinals		Final
Pan Yu-fen (TPE); Wang Ya-ting (TPE)	445
Liza del Rosario (PHI); Krizziah Tabora (PHI)	413	Pan Yu-fen (TPE); Wang Ya-ting (TPE)	365
Zhang Yuhong (CHN); Zhang Chunli (CHN)	443	Zhang Yuhong (CHN); Zhang Chunli (CHN)	404
Aldila Indryati (INA); Tannya Roumimper (INA)	394			Zhang Yuhong (CHN); Zhang Chunli (CHN)	457
Kim Moon-jeong (KOR); Jung Da-wun (KOR)	470			Baek Seung-ja (KOR); Hong Hae-ni (KOR)	407
Alexis Sy (PHI); Lara Posadas (PHI)	429	Kim Moon-jeong (KOR); Jung Da-wun (KOR)	397
Baek Seung-ja (KOR); Hong Hae-ni (KOR)	401	Baek Seung-ja (KOR); Hong Hae-ni (KOR)	429
Milki Ng (HKG); Chan Shuk Han (HKG)	369

==== Team of 4 ====
===== Preliminary =====
25 September

Rank	Team	Score
1	South Korea (KOR)	5004
2	Philippines (PHI)	4896
3	China (CHN)	4853
4	Chinese Taipei (TPE)	4815
5	Thailand (THA)	4797
6	Indonesia (INA)	4794
7	Hong Kong (HKG)	4481
8	Turkmenistan (TKM)	3676

===== Knockout round =====
Semifinals; 26 September		Final; 27 September
South Korea	942
Chinese Taipei	830	South Korea	873
Philippines	780	Philippines	801
China	737
