= Dancesport at the 2017 Asian Indoor and Martial Arts Games =

- Venue: Ashgabat Taekwondo and Dancesport Arena
- Dates: 25–26 September 2017

Dancesport at the 2017 Asian Indoor and Martial Arts Games was held in Ashgabat, Turkmenistan from 25 to 26 September 2017 at the Taekwondo and Dancesport Arena.

== Medalists ==
=== Standard ===
Event	Gold	Silver	Bronze
Quickstep	China; Qiu Yuming; Wei Liying	Japan; Minato Kojima; Megumi Morita	South Korea; Lee Jun-hyeok; Yang Hye-jeong
Slow foxtrot	China; Qiu Yuming; Wei Liying	Japan; Takeshi Yamamoto; Tomomi Yamamoto	South Korea; Lee Jun-hyeok; Yang Hye-jeong
Tango	China; Yuan Shaoyang; Qi Chongxuan	Hong Kong; Sam Liu; Liu Wan Hin	South Korea; Kim Dong-soo; Hong In-hwa
Viennese waltz	Japan; Takeshi Yamamoto; Tomomi Yamamoto	Philippines; German Enriquez; Danella Publico	Macau; Tam Ka Pan; Vong Weng Lam
Waltz	China; Yuan Shaoyang; Qi Chongxuan	Hong Kong; Sam Liu; Liu Wan Hin	South Korea; Kim Dong-soo; Hong In-hwa

=== Latin ===
Event	Gold	Silver	Bronze
Cha-cha-cha	South Korea; Kang Mun-seong; Park Ji-soo	China; Jiang Jiahao; Zhao Wanzhen	Japan; Sota Fujii; Ami Yoshikawa
Jive	South Korea; Nam Gi-yong; Shin Na-ra	China; Yan Bangbang; Zhu Jing	Philippines; Gerald Jamili; Cherry Clarice Parcon
Paso doble	China; Yan Bangbang; Zhu Jing	Hong Kong; Chan Hing Wai; Tin Lai Ki	Kyrgyzstan; Aleksei Kibkalo; Tatiana Kogadei
Rumba	South Korea; Kang Mun-seong; Park Ji-soo	Hong Kong; Chan Hing Wai; Tin Lai Ki	Thailand; Jettapon Inthakun; Apichaya Kuptawanith
Samba	Kyrgyzstan; Aleksei Kibkalo; Tatiana Kogadei	South Korea; Nam Gi-yong; Shin Na-ra	China; Jiang Jiahao; Zhao Wanzhen

=== Salsa ===
Event	Gold	Silver	Bronze
Salsa on one	Vietnam; Nguyễn Trung Kiên; Phạm Hồng Anh	Hong Kong; Ng Sum Chun; Lam Wai Yi	Turkmenistan; Aleksandr Sisekin; Waleriýa Nepomnýaşaýa

== Medal table ==
Rank	Nation	Gold	Silver	Bronze	Total
1	China (CHN)	5	2	1	8
2	South Korea (KOR)	3	1	4	8
3	Japan (JPN)	1	2	1	4
4	Kyrgyzstan (KGZ)	1	0	1	2
5	Vietnam (VIE)	1	0	0	1
6	Hong Kong (HKG)	0	5	0	5
7	Philippines (PHI)	0	1	1	2
8	Macau (MAC)	0	0	1	1
8	Thailand (THA)	0	0	1	1
8	Turkmenistan (TKM)	0	0	1	1
Totals (10 entries)		11	11	11	33

== Results ==
=== Standard ===
==== Quickstep ====
25 September

Rank	Team	SF	Final
1st place, gold medalist(s)	Qiu Yuming / Wei Liying (CHN)	32.916	34.142
2nd place, silver medalist(s)	Minato Kojima / Megumi Morita (JPN)	31.100	31.750
3rd place, bronze medalist(s)	Lee Jun-hyeok / Yang Hye-jeong (KOR)	30.316	30.708
4	Issarapong Duangkaew / Thanawan Yananun (THA)	29.734	30.475
5	Yeung Man Ching / Chiu Kit Ying (HKG)	28.400	29.142
6	Edwin Teo / Kimberly Tan (MAS)	28.466	29.125
7	Cheng Wan-jen / Zhang Liwen (TPE)	27.916	
8	Vũ Hoàng Anh Minh / Nguyễn Trường Xuân (VIE)	26.582	

==== Slow foxtrot ====
25 September

Rank	Team	SF	Final
1st place, gold medalist(s)	Qiu Yuming / Wei Liying (CHN)	33.216	34.082
2nd place, silver medalist(s)	Takeshi Yamamoto / Tomomi Yamamoto (JPN)	31.166	32.374
3rd place, bronze medalist(s)	Lee Jun-hyeok / Yang Hye-jeong (KOR)	30.400	31.792
4	Renat Shafikov / Natalya Ten (UZB)	29.916	31.225
5	Sarun Pibull / Chanisara Pithanpuwakorn (THA)	30.600	30.967
6	Sean Aranar / Ana Nualla (PHI)	29.416	30.184
7	Cheng Wan-jen / Zhang Liwen (TPE)	29.066	
8	Yeung Man Ching / Chiu Kit Ying (HKG)	29.000	
9	Vũ Hoàng Anh Minh / Nguyễn Trường Xuân (VIE)	26.916	
10	Christopher Low / Catrina Low (MAS)	24.434	

==== Tango ====
25 September

Rank	Team	SF	Final
1st place, gold medalist(s)	Yuan Shaoyang / Qi Chongxuan (CHN)	32.666	33.499
2nd place, silver medalist(s)	Sam Liu / Liu Wan Hin (HKG)	30.334	31.750
3rd place, bronze medalist(s)	Kim Dong-soo / Hong In-hwa (KOR)	31.034	30.867
4	Minato Kojima / Megumi Morita (JPN)	30.384	30.675
5	German Enriquez / Danella Publico (PHI)	29.500	30.458
6	Issarapong Duangkaew / Thanawan Yananun (THA)	28.918	30.275
7	Edwin Teo / Kimberly Tan (MAS)	27.334	
8	Tam Ka Pan / Vong Weng Lam (MAC)	26.500	
9	Daniel Costantine / Cynthia El-Haddad (LBN)	24.234	
10	Nyamdelgeriin Bilgüün / Khadbaataryn Erdenetsetseg (MGL)	23.750	

==== Viennese waltz ====
25 September

Rank	Team	SF	Final
1st place, gold medalist(s)	Takeshi Yamamoto / Tomomi Yamamoto (JPN)	31.084	32.291
2nd place, silver medalist(s)	German Enriquez / Danella Publico (PHI)	30.400	30.000
3rd place, bronze medalist(s)	Tam Ka Pan / Vong Weng Lam (MAC)	28.616	28.167
4	Nguyễn Đức Hòa / Nguyễn Thị Hải Yến (VIE)	27.134	27.383
5	Dmitriy Li / Polina Solyanok (UZB)	26.750	27.100
6	Meýlis Atamyradow / Lidiýa Gogolewa (TKM)	22.600	22.876

==== Waltz ====
25 September

Rank	Team	SF	Final
1st place, gold medalist(s)	Yuan Shaoyang / Qi Chongxuan (CHN)	31.700	33.333
2nd place, silver medalist(s)	Sam Liu / Liu Wan Hin (HKG)	30.916	31.000
3rd place, bronze medalist(s)	Kim Dong-soo / Hong In-hwa (KOR)	30.666	30.959
4	Sarun Pibull / Chanisara Pithanpuwakorn (THA)	29.900	30.392
5	Sean Aranar / Ana Nualla (PHI)	28.800	29.608
6	Nguyễn Đức Hòa / Nguyễn Thị Hải Yến (VIE)	27.250	28.059
7	Dmitriy Li / Polina Solyanok (UZB)	26.384	
8	Raed Mourad / Stephanie Sader (LBN)	25.216	
9	Christopher Low / Catrina Low (MAS)	24.582	
10	Nyamdelgeriin Bilgüün / Khadbaataryn Erdenetsetseg (MGL)	23.418	

=== Latin ===
==== Cha-cha-cha ====
26 September

Rank	Team	SF	Final
1st place, gold medalist(s)	Kang Mun-seong / Park Ji-soo (KOR)	30.666	32.000
2nd place, silver medalist(s)	Jiang Jiahao / Zhao Wanzhen (CHN)	31.433	31.999
3rd place, bronze medalist(s)	Sota Fujii / Ami Yoshikawa (JPN)	30.166	31.984
4	Michael Angelo Marquez / Stephanie Sabalo (PHI)	30.084	31.834
5	Jettapon Inthakun / Apichaya Kuptawanith (THA)	30.500	31.292
6	Georgiy Tretyakov / Anastasiya Tretyakova (UZB)	30.084	31.291
7	Peng Yen-ming / Chi Hsin-chi (TPE)	29.400	
8	Adiyaajavyn Baasanjav / Tömörkhuyagiin Nandin-Erdene (MGL)	27.667	
9	Raed Mourad / Stephanie Sader (LBN)	27.550	
10	Arpit Jain / Aishwarya Ranjan (IND)	22.200	

==== Jive ====
26 September

Rank	Team	SF	Final
1st place, gold medalist(s)	Nam Gi-yong / Shin Na-ra (KOR)	32.084	33.499
2nd place, silver medalist(s)	Yan Bangbang / Zhu Jing (CHN)	32.616	33.000
3rd place, bronze medalist(s)	Gerald Jamili / Cherry Clarice Parcon (PHI)	31.250	32.876
4	Sota Fujii / Ami Yoshikawa (JPN)	31.000	32.583
5	Ng Sum Chun / Lam Wai Yi (HKG)	30.084	31.317
6	Sadawit Settachai / Nichkamol Ketphong (THA)	30.000	31.124
7	Georgiy Tretyakov / Anastasiya Tretyakova (UZB)	30.100	29.250
8	Lin Yung-cheng / Lin Pei-chen (TPE)	29.918	
9	Ooi Say Onn / Chong Kar Man (MAS)	27.918	
10	Che Tin Long / Lo Ka Weng (MAC)	27.500	
11	Daniel Costantine / Cynthia El-Haddad (LBN)	27.332	
12	Meýlis Atamyradow / Lidiýa Gogolewa (TKM)	26.918	
13	Banzragchiin Sürtögöldör / Renchindorjiin Nominzayaa (MGL)	26.500	

==== Paso doble ====
26 September

Rank	Team	SF	Final
1st place, gold medalist(s)	Yan Bangbang / Zhu Jing (CHN)	32.500	33.083
2nd place, silver medalist(s)	Chan Hing Wai / Tin Lai Ki (HKG)	31.350	32.750
3rd place, bronze medalist(s)	Aleksei Kibkalo / Tatiana Kogadei (KGZ)	32.584	32.708
4	Yumiya Kubota / Natsumi Tokuno (JPN)	31.334	32.416
5	Renat Shafikov / Natalya Ten (UZB)	29.916	30.667
6	Chan Victor / Preap Daniella (CAM)	29.750	30.175
7	Sadawit Settachai / Nichkamol Ketphong (THA)	29.584	
8	Chua Zjen Fong / Evon Chong (MAS)	29.166	
9	Trịnh Hoàng Khải / Phạm Phương Anh (VIE)	28.750	
10	Assadour Euredjian / Sandra Abbas (LBN)	27.500	
11	Ahmet Gylyjow / Anastasiýa Ýužakowa (TKM)	24.434	

==== Rumba ====
26 September

Rank	Team	SF	Final
1st place, gold medalist(s)	Kang Mun-seong / Park Ji-soo (KOR)	30.416	33.041
2nd place, silver medalist(s)	Chan Hing Wai / Tin Lai Ki (HKG)	31.384	32.334
3rd place, bronze medalist(s)	Jettapon Inthakun / Apichaya Kuptawanith (THA)	30.834	32.000
4	Gerald Jamili / Cherry Clarice Parcon (PHI)	31.000	31.792
5	Chan Victor / Preap Daniella (CAM)	29.668	30.166
6	Trịnh Hoàng Khải / Phạm Phương Anh (VIE)	29.500	29.875
7	Remus Tan / Riane Low (SGP)	29.250	
8	Peng Yen-ming / Chi Hsin-chi (TPE)	28.834	
9	Ooi Say Onn / Chong Kar Man (MAS)	28.284	
10	Adiyaajavyn Baasanjav / Tömörkhuyagiin Nandin-Erdene (MGL)	27.666	
11	Aleksandr Sisekin / Waleriýa Nepomnýaşaýa (TKM)	27.334	
12	Assadour Euredjian / Sandra Abbas (LBN)	27.084	

==== Samba ====
26 September

Rank	Team	SF	Final
1st place, gold medalist(s)	Aleksei Kibkalo / Tatiana Kogadei (KGZ)	32.084	33.666
2nd place, silver medalist(s)	Nam Gi-yong / Shin Na-ra (KOR)	30.416	32.917
3rd place, bronze medalist(s)	Jiang Jiahao / Zhao Wanzhen (CHN)	31.668	32.458
4	Yumiya Kubota / Natsumi Tokuno (JPN)	31.418	31.750
5	Michael Angelo Marquez / Stephanie Sabalo (PHI)	30.500	31.291
6	Remus Tan / Riane Low (SGP)	29.584	30.167
7	Lin Yung-cheng / Lin Pei-chen (TPE)	29.850	29.417
8	Chua Zjen Fong / Evon Chong (MAS)	29.168	
9	Nguyễn Trung Kiên / Phạm Hồng Anh (VIE)	29.082	
10	Che Tin Long / Lo Ka Weng (MAC)	27.566	
11	Banzragchiin Sürtögöldör / Renchindorjiin Nominzayaa (MGL)	25.700	
12	Nikita Swýatelik / Mariýa Korçagina (TKM)	23.434	
13	Arpit Jain / Aishwarya Ranjan (IND)	21.416	

=== Salsa ===
==== Salsa on one ====
25 September

Rank	Team	SF	Final
1st place, gold medalist(s)	Nguyễn Trung Kiên / Phạm Hồng Anh (VIE)	30.934	32.250
2nd place, silver medalist(s)	Ng Sum Chun / Lam Wai Yi (HKG)	30.950	31.166
3rd place, bronze medalist(s)	Aleksandr Sisekin / Waleriýa Nepomnýaşaýa (TKM)	29.100	30.850
4	Madhav Banati / Aashna Bagri (IND)	28.100	28.175
