= China at the 2017 Asian Indoor and Martial Arts Games =

- IOC code: CHN
- NOC: Chinese Olympic Committee
- Website: www.olympic.cn (in Chinese and English)

in Ashgabat September 17–27
- Competitors: 202 in 12 sports

Asian Indoor and Martial Arts Games appearances
- 2005; 2007; 2009; 2013; 2017; 2021; 2025

The People's Republic of China competed at the 2017 Asian Indoor and Martial Arts Games in Ashgabat, Turkmenistan, from 17 to 27 September 2017.

== Indoor athletics ==
Key

- Note–Ranks given for track events are within the athlete's heat only
- Q = Qualified for the next round
- q = Qualified for the next round as a fastest loser or, in field events, by position without achieving the qualifying target
- NR = National record
- N/A = Round not applicable for the event
- Bye = Athlete not required to compete in round

Men
Track events

Athlete	Event	Round 1		Semifinal		Final	
Athlete	Event	Result	Rank	Result	Rank	Result	Rank
Chang Yizhong	800 m	1:56.20	3 q	1:54.20	5	Did not advance	
Deng Hantao	400 m	50.42	2 Q	51.06	5	Did not advance	
He Yuhong	60 m	7.01	4 q	7.07	7	Did not advance	
Huang Yonglian	60 m	6.76	1 Q	6.74	2 Q	6.71	5
Liu Dezhu	800 m	1:55.04	2 Q	1:53.76	4	Did not advance	
Tao Zelang	3000 m	—		9:01.08	7	Did not advance	
Xu Bo	400 m	49.69	3 q	49.77	5	Did not advance	
Yang Kegu	3000 m	—		8:40.27	6 q	8:45.06	11
Yi Yulong	60 m hurdles	—		8.67	6	Did not advance	
Zhan Qi	1500 m	—		4:05.15	5	Did not advance	
Zhang Dayu	1500 m	—		3:58.56	3 q	4:08.38	8
Zhu Shenglong	60 m hurdles	—		8.40	6	Did not advance	
Deng Hantao; He Shitong; Wang Jianlong; Xu Bo; Zhang Renjie	4 × 400 m relay	—		3:21.97	3 Q	3:23.13	5

Field events

Athlete	Event	Final	
Athlete	Event	Distance	Position
Chen Yang	Pole vault	4.60	5
He Xilong	Long jump	7.07	8
Liu Liming	High jump	2.05	7
Liu Yang	Shot put	18.24	7
Tao Yege	Long jump	NM	—
Tian Zizhong	Shot put	18.42	6
Wan Hanchen	Triple jump	15.26	8
Yang Lucheng	Pole vault	4.40	6
Zheng Zehao	Triple jump	NM	—

Women
Track events

Athlete	Event	Round 1		Semifinal		Final	
Athlete	Event	Result	Rank	Result	Rank	Result	Rank
Chen Jiexin	60 m hurdles	—		8.86	4 q	12.54	8
Deng Changhong	400 m	59.39	2 Q	59.04	5	Did not advance	
Feng Lulu	60 m	—		7.46	2 Q	7.54	6
Gong Luying	60 m	—		7.80	6	Did not advance	
Li Chunhui	1500 m	—				4:41.07	4
Liang Yina	400 m	57.48	2 Q	56.71	3 Q	56.32	5
Liu Fang	3000 m	—				10:10.38	4
Lu Mengyao	800 m	—		2:22.31	4	Did not advance	
Wang Jinyu	3000 m	—				9:57.43	3rd place, bronze medalist(s)
Yao Hui	60 m hurdles	—		9.11	3 Q	9.10	6
Zeng Ting	1500 m	—				4:43.00	5
Zhang Guiping	800 m	—		2:15.87	1 Q	2:07.65	2nd place, silver medalist(s)
Deng Changhong; Li Xingyuan; Liang Yina; Tao Yanan; Wang Meiru; Zhu Cuiwei	4 × 400 m relay	—				3:47.35	2nd place, silver medalist(s)

Field events

Athlete	Event	Final	
Athlete	Event	Distance	Position
Bian Ka	Shot put	17.34	1st place, gold medalist(s)
Gong Luying	Long jump	5.99	4
Pan Youqi	Triple jump	12.91	5
Tan Qiujiao	Triple jump	13.10	3rd place, bronze medalist(s)

== Cue sports ==
Men

Athlete	Event	Round of 64	Round of 32	Round of 16	Quarterfinal	Semifinal	Final	
Athlete	Event	Opposition Result	Opposition Result	Opposition Result	Opposition Result	Opposition Result	Opposition Result	Rank
Liu Haitao	9-Ball Pool Singles	Bye	Abdulla (UAE); W 9–3	Orcollo (PHI); W 9–6	Ko P.Y. (TPE); L 6–9	Did not advance		
Lyu Haotian	6-Red Snooker Singles	—	Chau H.M. (HKG); W 5–0	Kachaiwong (THA); W 5–1	Vahedi (IRI); L 1–5	Did not advance		
Lyu Haotian	9-Ball Pool Singles	Bye	Al-Ars (QAT); L DNS	Did not advance				
Yan Bingtao	6-Red Snooker Singles	—	Bye	Sanzai (AFG); W 5–1	Chawla (IND); W 5–1	Sajjad (PAK); W 5–3	Vahedi (IRI)	
Zhao Xintong	Snooker Singles	—	Bye					
Zhou Yuelong	Snooker Singles	—	Bye					
Liu Haitao; Lyu Haotian	9-Ball Pool Scotch Doubles	—		Afghanistan (AFG)				
Yan Bingtao; Zhao Xintong; Zhou Yuelong	Snooker Team	—		Bye				

Women

Athlete	Event	Round of 16	Quarterfinal	Semifinal	Final	
Athlete	Event	Opposition Result	Opposition Result	Opposition Result	Opposition Result	Rank
Bai Ge	6-Red Snooker Singles	Ranola (PHI)				
Chen Siming	10-Ball Pool Singles	Centeno (PHI)				
Han Yu	9-Ball Pool Singles	Mangli (IRI); W 7–1	Chou C.Y. (TPE); W 7–3	Kim G.Y. (KOR)		
Liu Shasha	9-Ball Pool Singles	Fathy (MDV); W 7–0	Lim Y.M. (KOR); W 7–3	Centeno (PHI)		
Wang Xiaotong	6-Red Snooker Singles	Magimairajan (IND); W 4–1	Wan K.K. (HKG)			

== Muay Thai ==
Men

Athlete	Event	Round of 16	Quarterfinal	Semifinal	Final	
Athlete	Event	Opposition Result	Opposition Result	Opposition Result	Opposition Result	Rank
Luo Chenghao	−54 kg	Kwok W.H. (HKG); W 30–27	Nazrivali (TJK); W 29–28	Phonkrathok (THA); L 27–30	Did not advance	3rd place, bronze medalist(s)
Chen Yahong	−60 kg	Bye	Nurmetow (TKM); L 27–30	Did not advance		
Yang Yunpeng	−63.5 kg	Ghaljaee (AFG); L RSC	Did not advance			
Yuan Pengbin	−63.5 kg	Jahangir (AFG); L 27–30	Did not advance			
Shan Yanbin	−67 kg	Bye	Saparmyradow (TKM); L RSC	Did not advance		
Zhang Jinglei	−67 kg	Mobariz (AFG); W 30–27	Nezhad (IRI); L 27–30	Did not advance		
Guo Dongwang	−71 kg	Bye	Rowsanow (TKM); W 29–28	Neftaliyev (KAZ); W 29–28	Neftaliyev (THA)	
Zhang Yongkang	−75 kg	Hussaini (AFG); L 27–30	Did not advance			
Du An	−81 kg	Guyjow (TKM); L RSC	Did not advance			
Luo Can	−81 kg	Bahar (AFG); W 29–28	Guyjow (TKM); L 27–30	Did not advance		

Women

Athlete	Event	Quarterfinal	Semifinal	Final	
Athlete	Event	Opposition Result	Opposition Result	Opposition Result	Rank
Xu Yi	−54 kg	Rowsanov (IRN); W 30–27	Tehiran (THA); L 27–30	Did not advance	3rd place, bronze medalist(s)
Chen Linling	−60 kg	Batyrowa (TKM); W KOB	Wihantamma (THA); L 27–30	Did not advance	3rd place, bronze medalist(s)

== Taekwondo ==
Athlete	Event	Round of 32	Round of 16	Quarterfinals	Semifinals	Final	
Athlete	Event	Opposition Result	Opposition Result	Opposition Result	Opposition Result	Opposition Result	Rank
Ouyang Xiongbin	Men's −54 kg	Bye	Nematov (TJK); L 11–13	Did not advance			
Wu Yichao	Men's −58 kg	Bye	Nasyrov (TJK); W 14–11	Pulatov (UZB); L 5–17	Did not advance		
Xiao Chenming	Men's −63 kg	Berkeliyew (TKM); W 25–20	Klompong (THA); L 11–13	Did not advance			
Song Guodong	Men's −68 kg	Bye	Safari (AFG); W 23–3	Salaev (UZB); L 13–17	Did not advance		
Ren Ke	Men's −74 kg	Kim J.R. (KOR); W 24–4	Al-Mabruk (KSA); W DSQ	Yang T.Y. (TPE); W 23–20	Jalali (IRI); L 13–21	Did not advance	3rd place, bronze medalist(s)
Chen Linglong	Men's −80 kg	—	Wangchuk (BHU); W 28–0	Dela Cruz (PHI); W 17–8	El-Sharabatyz (JOR); W 15–10	Nazemi (IRI); L 12–13	2nd place, silver medalist(s)
Liu Jintao	Men's −87 kg	—	Adil (PAK); W 24–0	Defaix (TAH); W 8–0	Uy (PHI); W 27–10	Rajabi (IRI); L 16–18	2nd place, silver medalist(s)
Zhu Yuxiang	Men's Individual Poomsae	—					
Deng Tingfeng; Hu Mingda; Zhu Yuxiang	Men's Team Poomsae	—					
Tan Xueqin	Women's −46 kg	—	Rezaiee (AFG); W 23–3	Yaqubi (AFG); W 28–0	Madahi (IRI); W 9–2	Han N.Y. (KOR); W 20–2	1st place, gold medalist(s)
Zuo Ju	Women's −49 kg	—	Lam S.W. (HKG); W 20–11	Daraghmi (JOR); L 9–12	Did not advance		
Wei Xiaojing	Women's −53 kg	—	Ahmadi (AFG); W 25–2	Harnsujin (THA); L 7–10	Did not advance		
Zhou Lijun	Women's −57 kg	—	Bye	Abu-Eisheh (JOR); W 9–3	Parsa (IRI); W 17–7	Chen Y.C. (TPE); L 10–20	2nd place, silver medalist(s)
Zhang Mengyu	Women's −62 kg	—	Sonam (IND); W DSQ	Lin Y.C. (TPE); W 12–8	Hà (VIE); W 12–8	Javadikouchaksaraei (IRI); L 13–15	2nd place, silver medalist(s)
Gao Pan	Women's −67 kg	—	Jang E.J. (KOR); W 8–7	Yergeshova (KAZ); W 24–1	Al Sadeq (JOR); W 23–6	Chen Y.Y. (TPE); W 23–6	1st place, gold medalist(s)
Niu Lulu	Women's −73 kg	—	Bye	Ma T.H. (TPE); L 15–18	Did not advance		
Wei Mengyue	Women's Individual Poomsae	—					
Liu Yuqing; Wei Mengyue; Wu Limei	Women's Team Poomsae	—					

== Weightlifting ==
Men

Athlete	Event	Snatch		Clean & jerk		Total	Rank
Athlete	Event	Result	Rank	Result	Rank	Total	Rank
Jia Xionghui	−56 kg	128	2	141	3	269	3rd place, bronze medalist(s)
Lei Haitao	−62 kg	131	3	157	2	288	2nd place, silver medalist(s)
Deng Shiwei	−69 kg	148	1	179	1	327	1st place, gold medalist(s)
Chen Hu	−85 kg						
Liu Hao	−94 kg						
Ding Fengshan	+105 kg						

Women

Athlete	Event	Snatch		Clean & jerk		Total	Rank
Athlete	Event	Result	Rank	Result	Rank	Total	Rank
Xiao Huiying	−48 kg	80	3	110	1	190	1st place, gold medalist(s)
Liao Qiuyun	−53 kg	93	1	115	1	208	1st place, gold medalist(s)
Luo Xiaomin	−58 kg	100	1	122	1	222	1st place, gold medalist(s)
Yuan Wangjian	−63 kg	103	1	120	2	223	1st place, gold medalist(s)
Jia Weipeng	+90 kg						
