= Esports at the 2017 Asian Indoor and Martial Arts Games =

- Venue: Ashgabat Indoor Athletics Arena
- Dates: 25–27 September 2017

Various video game esports competitions were played at the 2017 Asian Indoor and Martial Arts Games as a demonstration sport. Medals won in this sport were not included in the official overall medal tally.

Four video game categories were contested at the games, which include Hearthstone, StarCraft II: Legacy of the Void, The King of Fighters XIV, and Dota 2. All 64 National Olympic Committees (NOCs) from Asia and Oceania were eligible to send players for the qualification phase for Electronic sports. A two-month qualification process was conducted with players and teams securing qualification for the final tournament by May 2017. The players registered through an online portal by Alisports, a subsidiary of Alibaba Group.

KeSPA, the esport organization of South Korea, announced its withdrawn from the games on May 25, 2017, citing that it concerned about the level of organization of Alisports, and not including League of Legends, the most popular MOBA game of the world, as a medal event.

== Medalists ==
| Event | Gold | Silver | Bronze |
|---|---|---|---|
| Hearthstone | Liu Bo; China | Tümenbayaryn Nambarjin; Mongolia | Chen Yung-he; Chinese Taipei |
| StarCraft II: Legacy of the Void | Zhou Hang; China | Wang Lei; China | Bataagiin Ononbat; Mongolia |
| The King of Fighters XIV | Lin Chia-hung; Chinese Taipei | Tseng Chia-chen; Chinese Taipei | Su Haojun; China |
| Dota 2 | China; Li Chunbo; Xu Ziyang; Lu Kang; Lu Hao; Zhan Yaoyang | China; Zheng Yuanxing; Luo Bin; Chen Hang; Yang Yuepeng; Flecher | Philippines; James Inocencio; John Linuel Abanto; Djardel Mampusti; Carlo Manalo; Mark Louise Reyes |

== Medal table ==
| Rank | Nation | Gold | Silver | Bronze | Total |
|---|---|---|---|---|---|
| 1 | China (CHN) | 3 | 2 | 1 | 6 |
| 2 | Chinese Taipei (TPE) | 1 | 1 | 1 | 3 |
| 3 | Mongolia (MGL) | 0 | 1 | 1 | 2 |
| 4 | Philippines (PHI) | 0 | 0 | 1 | 1 |
| Totals (4 entries) | | 4 | 4 | 4 | 12 |

== Results ==
=== Hearthstone ===
==== Group stage ====
25 September

Group A
| Pos | Athlete | Pld | W | L | Pts | CHN | LAO | PAK |
|---|---|---|---|---|---|---|---|---|
| 1 | Liu Bo (CHN) | 2 | 2 | 0 | 6 | — | 3–0 | 3–0 |
| 2 | Nanthanakone Vongxay (LAO) | 2 | 1 | 1 | 3 | 0–3 | — | 3–0 |
| 3 | Sardar Muhammad Husnain (PAK) | 2 | 0 | 2 | 0 | 0–3 | 0–3 | — |

Group B
| Pos | Athlete | Pld | W | L | Pts | PHI | PHI | PAK |
|---|---|---|---|---|---|---|---|---|
| 1 | Richard Castillo (PHI) | 2 | 2 | 0 | 6 | — | 3–0 | 3–0 |
| 2 | Dustin Mangulabnan (PHI) | 2 | 1 | 1 | 3 | 0–3 | — | 3–1 |
| 3 | Saqib Shoukat (PAK) | 2 | 0 | 2 | 0 | 0–3 | 1–3 | — |

Group C
| Pos | Athlete | Pld | W | L | Pts | MGL | TPE | TKM |
|---|---|---|---|---|---|---|---|---|
| 1 | Tümenbayaryn Nambarjin (MGL) | 2 | 2 | 0 | 6 | — | 3–2 | 3–1 |
| 2 | Tsao Tsu-lin (TPE) | 2 | 1 | 1 | 3 | 2–3 | — | 3–1 |
| 3 | Serdar Nurmyradow (TKM) | 2 | 0 | 2 | 0 | 1–3 | 1–3 | — |

Group D
| Pos | Athlete | Pld | W | L | Pts | CHN | TPE | KAZ |
|---|---|---|---|---|---|---|---|---|
| 1 | Liu Shuda (CHN) | 2 | 2 | 0 | 6 | — | 3–2 | 3–2 |
| 2 | Chen Yung-he (TPE) | 2 | 1 | 1 | 3 | 2–3 | — | 3–2 |
| 3 | Olzhas Batyrbekov (KAZ) | 2 | 0 | 2 | 0 | 2–3 | 2–3 | — |

Source: Official website

==== Playoffs ====
26 September

Quarterfinals
Liu Bo (CHN) | 3
Tsao Tsu-lin (TPE) | 0
Richard Castillo (PHI) | 1
Chen Yung-he (TPE) | 3
Nanthanakone Vongxay (LAO) | 1
Tümenbayaryn Nambarjin (MGL) | 3
Dustin Mangulabnan (PHI) | 2
Liu Shuda (CHN) | 3

Semifinals
Liu Bo (CHN) | 3
Chen Yung-he (TPE) | 1
Tümenbayaryn Nambarjin (MGL) | 3
Liu Shuda (CHN) | 0

Final
Liu Bo (CHN) | 3
Tümenbayaryn Nambarjin (MGL) | 1
3rd place decider
Chen Yung-he (TPE) | 3
Liu Shuda (CHN) | 2

=== StarCraft II: Legacy of the Void ===
==== Group stage ====
25 September

Group A
| Pos | Athlete | Pld | W | L | Pts | CHN | TPE | PHI | IRI |
|---|---|---|---|---|---|---|---|---|---|
| 1 | Zhou Hang (CHN) | 3 | 3 | 0 | 9 | — | 2–0 | 2–0 | 2–0 |
| 2 | Huang Yu-hsiang (TPE) | 3 | 2 | 1 | 6 | 0–2 | — | 2–0 | 2–0 |
| 3 | Cenon Mayor (PHI) | 3 | 1 | 2 | 3 | 0–2 | 0–2 | — | 2–0 |
| 4 | Nikan Sabouri (IRI) | 3 | 0 | 3 | 0 | 0–2 | 0–2 | 0–2 | — |

Group B
| Pos | Athlete | Pld | W | L | Pts | MGL | TPE | CHN | PHI |
|---|---|---|---|---|---|---|---|---|---|
| 1 | Bataagiin Ononbat (MGL) | 3 | 3 | 0 | 9 | — | 2–0 | 2–1 | 2–0 |
| 2 | Chen Ming-cheng (TPE) | 3 | 2 | 1 | 6 | 0–2 | — | 2–1 | 2–0 |
| 3 | Wang Lei (CHN) | 3 | 1 | 2 | 3 | 1–2 | 1–2 | — | 2–0 |
| 4 | Jess Tamboboy (PHI) | 3 | 0 | 3 | 0 | 0–2 | 0–2 | 0–2 | — |

Source: Official website

==== Playoffs ====
Quarterfinals; 26 September
Cenon Mayor (PHI) | 1
Chen Ming-cheng (TPE) | 3
Wang Lei (CHN) | 3
Huang Yu-hsiang (TPE) | 1

Semifinals; 26 September
Zhou Hang (CHN) | 3
Chen Ming-cheng (TPE) | 0
Bataagiin Ononbat (MGL) | 0
Wang Lei (CHN) | 3

Final; 26–27 September
Zhou Hang (CHN) | 3
Wang Lei (CHN) | 1
3rd place decider
Chen Ming-cheng (TPE) | 1
Bataagiin Ononbat (MGL) | 3

=== The King of Fighters XIV ===
==== Group stage ====
25 September

Group A
| Pos | Athlete | Pld | W | L | Pts | CHN | TPE | TPE | PHI |
|---|---|---|---|---|---|---|---|---|---|
| 1 | Su Haojun (CHN) | 3 | 2 | 1 | 6 | — | 2–3 | 3–0 | 3–0 |
| 2 | Tseng Chia-chen (TPE) | 3 | 2 | 1 | 6 | 3–2 | — | 1–3 | 3–0 |
| 3 | Lin Chia-hung (TPE) | 3 | 2 | 1 | 6 | 0–3 | 3–1 | — | 3–0 |
| 4 | Princeton Jagolino (PHI) | 3 | 0 | 3 | 0 | 0–3 | 0–3 | 0–3 | — |

Group B
| Pos | Athlete | Pld | W | L | Pts | PHI | IRI | PAK | PAK |
|---|---|---|---|---|---|---|---|---|---|
| 1 | Rodolfo Panganiban (PHI) | 3 | 3 | 0 | 9 | — | 3–0 | 3–2 | 3–0 |
| 2 | Ali Soltanabadi (IRI) | 3 | 2 | 1 | 6 | 0–3 | — | 3–0 | 3–1 |
| 3 | Shahid Hameed (PAK) | 3 | 1 | 2 | 3 | 2–3 | 0–3 | — | 3–2 |
| 4 | Usman Farooq (PAK) | 3 | 0 | 3 | 0 | 0–3 | 1–3 | 2–3 | — |

Source: Official website

==== Playoffs ====
26 September

Quarterfinals
Lin Chia-hung (TPE) | 3
Ali Soltanabadi (IRI) | 0
Tseng Chia-chen (TPE) | 3
Shahid Hameed (PAK) | 0

Semifinals
Su Haojun (CHN) | 1
Lin Chia-hung (TPE) | 3
Rodolfo Panganiban (PHI) | 0
Tseng Chia-chen (TPE) | 3

Final
Lin Chia-hung (TPE) | 3
Tseng Chia-chen (TPE) | 2
3rd place decider
Su Haojun (CHN) | 3
Rodolfo Panganiban (PHI) | 0

=== Dota 2 ===
==== Group stage ====
25–26 September

| Pos | Team | Pld | W | L | Pts | CHN | CHN | PHI | JOR | TKM |
|---|---|---|---|---|---|---|---|---|---|---|
| 1 | China B | 4 | 4 | 0 | 12 | — | 2–0 | 2–0 | 2–0 | 2–0 |
| 2 | China A | 4 | 3 | 1 | 9 | 0–2 | — | 2–0 | 2–0 | 2–0 |
| 3 | Philippines | 4 | 2 | 2 | 6 | 0–2 | 0–2 | — | 2–0 | 2–0 |
| 4 | Jordan | 4 | 1 | 3 | 3 | 0–2 | 0–2 | 0–2 | — | 2–0 |
| 5 | Turkmenistan | 4 | 0 | 4 | 0 | 0–2 | 0–2 | 0–2 | 0–2 | — |

Source: Official website

==== Playoffs ====
Semifinals; 26 September
China B | 2
Jordan | 0
China A | 2
Philippines | 1

Final; 26–27 September
China B | 2
China A | 0
3rd place decider
Jordan | 1
Philippines | 2
