= Philippines at the 2017 Asian Indoor and Martial Arts Games =

- IOC code: PHI
- NOC: Philippine Olympic Committee
- Website: www.olympic.ph (in English)

in Ashgabat
- Competitors: 121 in 17 sports
- Medals Ranked 19th: Gold 2 Silver 14 Bronze 14 Total 30

Asian Indoor and Martial Arts Games appearances
- 2005; 2007; 2009; 2013; 2017; 2021; 2026

The Philippines participated in the 2017 Asian Indoor and Martial Arts Games in Ashgabat, Turkmenistan from 17–27 September 2017.

The Philippine delegation competed in 17 out of 21 sports in the 10-day event, with over 105 athletes joining the games, led by 2016 Summer Olympics silver medalist Hidilyn Diaz. Diaz was initially announced as the country's flagbearer but she declined.

The chef de mission of the delegation was Monsour Del Rosario and the assistant chef de mission was Raymund Reyes. The Pre-AIMAG tournament directors were Paolo Vitug (Sambo), Erwin Marinas (Wrestling), Leo Panganiban (Kurash) and Rennie Ross (Kickboxing).

At the end of the games, the Philippine team brought home 30 medals, including two jiu-jitsu golds, the best performance the country has ever performed in the history of Asian Indoor and Martial Arts Games.

The country also competed at electronic sports which was a demonstration event participating in all four video games contested. The country secured a bronze medal in Dota 2.

== Medalists ==
=== Gold ===
No.	Medal	Name	Sport	Event	Date
1	Gold	Margarita Ochoa	Ju-jitsu	Women's Ne-waza -45kg	19 September
2	Gold	Annie Ramirez	Ju-jitsu	Women's Ne-waza -55kg	19 September

=== Silver ===
No.	Medal	Name	Sport	Event	Date
1	Silver	Marc Lim	Ju-jitsu	Men's Ne-waza -69kg	18 September
2	Silver	Gian Dee	Ju-jitsu	Men's Ne-waza -56kg	19 September
3	Silver	Kaila Napolis	Ju-jitsu	Women's Ne-waza -55kg	19 September
4	Silver	Hidilyn Diaz	Weightlifting	Women's 53kg	19 September
5	Silver	Rodolfo Reyes Jr.	Taekwondo	Men's Individual Poomsae	22 September
6	Silver	Jocel Lyn Ninobla	Taekwondo	Women's Individual Poomsae	22 September
7	Silver	Phillip Delarmino	Muay Thai	Men's -57kg	21 September
8	Silver	Eric Cray	Indoor Athletics	Men's 60m	19 September
9	Silver	German Enriquez; Danella Publico	Dancesport	Viennese Waltz	25 September
10	Silver	Kenneth Chua	Bowling	Men's Singles	21 September
11	Silver	Liza del Rosario; Lara Posadas; Alexis Sy; Krizziah Tabora	Bowling	Women's Team	27 September
12	Silver	Jan Emmanuel Garcia; Paulo Bersamina	Chess	Men’s Rapid Team Under-23	26 September
13	Silver	Chezka Centeno	Cue sports	Women's 9-Ball Singles	24 September
14	Silver	Rubilen Amit	Cue sports	Women's 10-Ball Singles	24 September

=== Bronze ===
No.	Medal	Name	Sport	Event	Date
1	Bronze	Kristopher Uy	Taekwondo	Men's Kyorugi -87kg	19 September
2	Bronze	Kirstie Alora	Taekwondo	Women's Kyorugi -73kg	19 September
3	Bronze	Francis Aaron Agojo	Taekwondo	Men's Kyorugi -58kg	20 September
4	Bronze	Rodolfo Reyes Jr. Dustin Mella; Raphael Mella	Taekwondo	Men's Team Poomsae	22 September
5	Bronze	Jocel Lyn Ninobla; Juvenile Crisostomo; Rinna Babanto	Taekwondo	Women's Team Poomsae	22 September
6	Bronze	Kristel Macrohon	Weightlifting	Women's 69kg	22 September
7	Bronze	Al Llamas	Kurash	Men's -60kg	20 September
8	Bronze	Warren Kiamco; Johann Chua	Cue sports	Men's 9-Ball Doubles	24 September
9	Bronze	Carlo Biado	Cue sports	Men's 9-Ball Singles	21 September
10	Bronze	Jan Emmanuel Garcia; Paulo Bersamina	Chess	Men’s Blitz Team Under-23	27 September
11	Bronze	Janelle Mae Frayna; Shania Mendoza	Chess	Women’s Rapid Team Under-23	26 September
12	Bronze	Gerald Jamili; Cherry Parcon	Dancesport	Jive	26 September
13	Bronze	Jefferson Manatad	Belt wrestling	Men's Classic Style 80kg	20 September
14	Bronze	Alvin Lobreguito	Turkmen goresh	Men's Freestyle 57kg	18 September

=== Demonstration sport ===
Earned medal in a demonstration sport is not counted in the Medal Haul.

No.	Medal	Name	Sport	Event	Date
1	Bronze	Philippines	ESports	Dota 2	26 September

=== Multiple ===
Name	Sport	Gold	Silver	Bronze	Total
Jan Emmanuel Garcia	Chess	0	1	1	2
Paulo Bersamina	Chess	0	1	1	2
Jocel Lyn Ninobla	Taekwondo	0	1	1	2
Rodolfo Reyes Jr.	Taekwondo	0	1	1	2

== Medal summary ==
=== By sports ===
Sport	Gold	Silver	Bronze	Total
Ju-jitsu	2	3	0	5
Taekwondo	0	2	5	7
Cue sports	0	2	2	4
Bowling	0	2	0	2
Chess	0	1	2	3
Dancesport	0	1	1	2
Weightlifting	0	1	1	2
Indoor athletics	0	1	0	1
Muay Thai	0	1	0	1
Belt wrestling	0	0	1	1
Kurash	0	0	1	1
Turkmen goresh	0	0	1	1
Totals (12 entries)	2	14	14	30
