= New Caledonia at the 2017 Asian Indoor and Martial Arts Games =

- IOC code: NCL

in Ashgabat 17–27 September
- Competitors: 2 in 1 sport
- Medals: Gold 0 Silver 0 Bronze 0 Total 0

Asian Indoor and Martial Arts Games appearances
- 2017; 2021; 2026

New Caledonia competed at the 2017 Asian Indoor and Martial Arts Games held in Ashgabat, Turkmenistan from September 17 to 27. New Caledonia sent a delegation of 2 competitors for bowling event.

They couldn't receive any medal at the Games.

New Caledonia along with other Oceania nations competed in the Asian Indoor and Martial Arts Games for the first time in history despite the suspension of the IOC of New Caledonia.

== Participants ==
Sport	Men	Women	Total
Bowling	1	1	2

== See also ==
- New Caledonia at the 2011 Pacific Games
- New Caledonia at the 2015 Pacific Games
