= Macau at the 2017 Asian Indoor and Martial Arts Games =

- IOC code: MAC
- NOC: Macau Sports and Olympic Committee

in Ashgabat 17–27 September
- Competitors: 35 in 8 sports
- Medals: Gold 0 Silver 0 Bronze 1 Total 1

Asian Indoor and Martial Arts Games appearances
- 2005; 2007; 2009; 2013; 2017; 2021; 2025

Macau competed at the 2017 Asian Indoor and Martial Arts Games from 17 to 27 September 2017. Macau sent a delegation consisting of 35 competitors for the multi-sport event.

Macau claimed its only medal (bronze medal) in the dancesport event.

== Participants ==
Sport	Men	Women	Total
Bowling	4	3	7
Chess	2	0	2
Dancesport	2	2	4
Indoor Athletics	2	1	3
Muay Thai	2	0	2
Short course swimming	4	4	8
Taekwondo	4	4	8
Track Cycling	1	0	1

== Medallists ==
Medal	Name	Sport	Event
Bronze	Tam Ka Pan and Vong Weng Lam	Dancesport	Men's Viennese Waltz
