= Malaysia at the 2017 Asian Indoor and Martial Arts Games =

- IOC code: MAS
- NOC: Olympic Council of Malaysia
- Website: www.olympic.org.my

in Ashgabat 17–27 September
- Competitors: 10 in 3 sports
- Medals: Gold 0 Silver 1 Bronze 0 Total 1

Asian Indoor and Martial Arts Games appearances
- 2005; 2007; 2009; 2013; 2017; 2021; 2025

Malaysia competed at the 2017 Asian Indoor and Martial Arts Games held in Ashgabat, Turkmenistan from September 17 to 27. Malaysia sent 10 competitors for the multi-sport event. Malaysia clinched its only medal in the men's 64kg taekwondo event.

== Participants ==
Sport	Men	Women	Total
Dancesport	4	4	8
Muay Thai	1	0	1
Taekwondo	1	0	1

== Medallist ==
Medal	Name	Sport	Event
Silver	Rozaimi Rozali	Taekwondo	Men's 64kg
