= Myanmar at the 2017 Asian Indoor and Martial Arts Games =

- IOC code: MYA
- NOC: Myanmar Olympic Committee
- Website: www.myasoc.org

in Ashgabat 17–27 September
- Competitors: 4 in 2 sports
- Medals Ranked 0th: Gold 0 Silver 0 Bronze 0 Total 0

Asian Indoor and Martial Arts Games appearances
- 2005; 2007; 2009; 2013; 2017; 2021; 2025

Myanmar competed at the 2017 Asian Indoor and Martial Arts Games held in Ashgabat, Turkmenistan from September 17 to 27.

Myanmar sent a delegation consisting of four competitors for two different sports. Myanmar was unable to win a medal in the competition.

== Participants ==
Sport	Men	Women	Total
Chess	2	0	2
Billiards	2	0	2
