= Maldives at the 2017 Asian Indoor and Martial Arts Games =

- IOC code: MDV
- NOC: Maldives Olympic Committee

in Ashgabat 17–27 September
- Competitors: 37 in 5 sports
- Medals: Gold 0 Silver 0 Bronze 0 Total 0

Asian Indoor and Martial Arts Games appearances
- 2005; 2007; 2009; 2013; 2017; 2021; 2025

Maldives competed at the 2017 Asian Indoor and Martial Arts Games held in Ashgabat, Turkmenistan from September 17 to 27. Maldives couldn't receive any medal at the Games.

== Participants ==
Sport	Men	Women	Total
Futsal	14	0	14
Billiards	6	2	8
Short course swimming	3	3	6
Chess	3	2	5
Indoor Athletics	4	0	4
