= Atippat Pornariyasombat =

Thai chess player (born 1973)

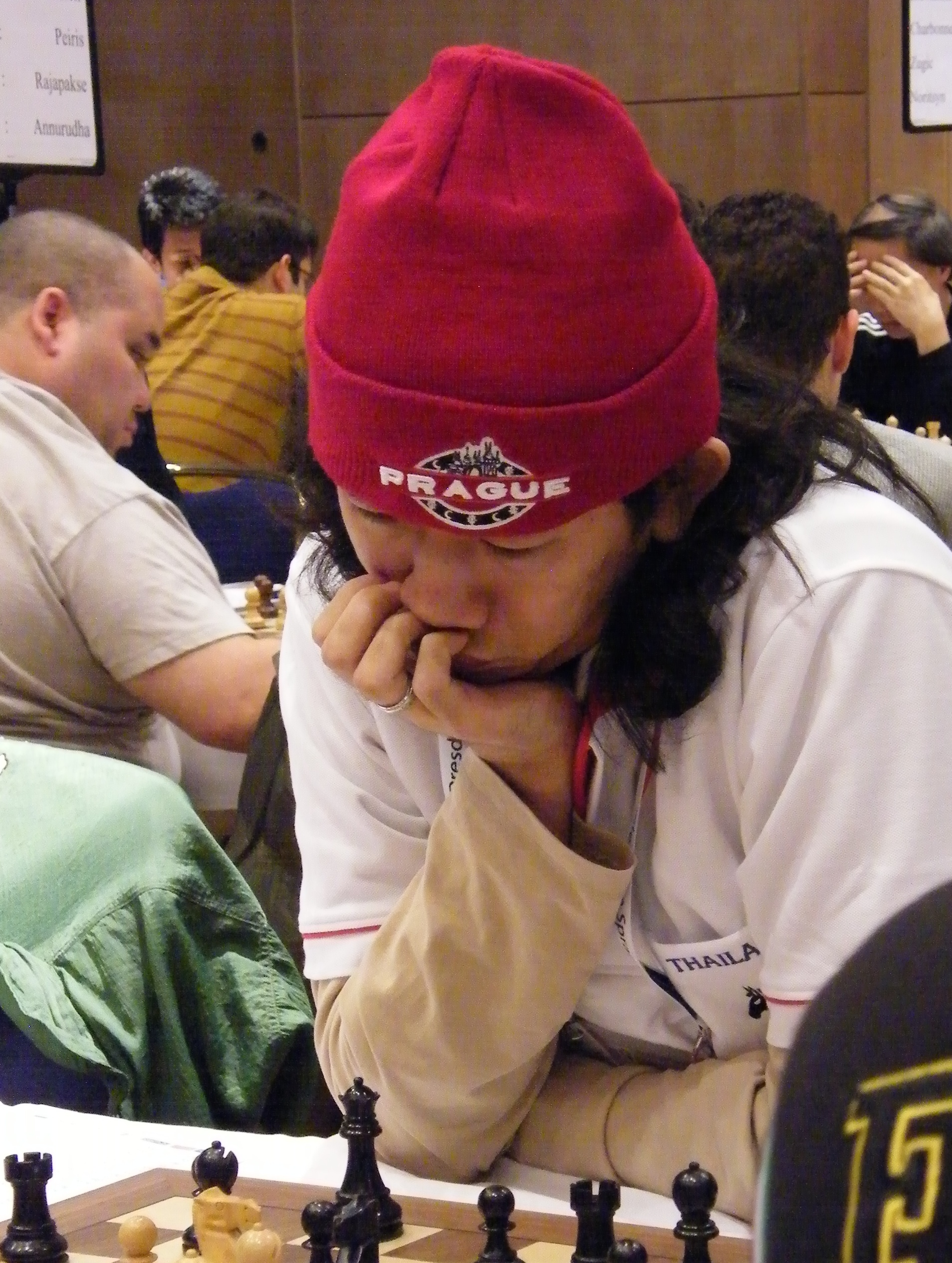
- Atippat in 2008

Personal information
- Born: 3 November 1973 (age 52) Bangkok, Thailand

Chess career
- Country: Bangkok, Thailand
- Title: Candidate Master
- FIDE rating: 1984 (October 2026)
- Peak rating: 2181 (July 2010)

Atippat Pornariyasombat (Thai: อธิปพัฒน์ พรอริยสมบัติ; born 3 November 1973) is a Thai chess player. He represented Thailand at hte 38th Chess Olympiad, 39th Chess Olympiad, and the 41st Chess Olympiad.

== Career ==
Pornariyasombat holds the FIDE title of Candidate Master. He has represented Thailand in the Chess Olympiad three times:

- in 2004, at the reserve board in the 36th Chess Olympiad in Calvià (+3, =2, -2);
- in 2008, at the first reserve board in the 38th Chess Olympiad in Dresden;
- in 2010, at the second reserve board in the 39th Chess Olympiad in Khanty-Mansiysk (+2, =3, -2).

Atippat has also represented Thailand at the Asian Team Chess Championship:

- in 2012, at the third board in the 17th Asian Team Chess Championship in Zaozhuang (+1, =2, -4).

He reached a career-peak FIDE classical rating of 2181 in July 2010.
