= United Arab Emirates at the 2017 Asian Indoor and Martial Arts Games =

- IOC code: UAE
- NOC: United Arab Emirates National Olympic Committee
- Website: www.uaenoc.ae

in Ashgabat 17–27 September
- Competitors: 52 in 7 sports
- Medals: Gold 5 Silver 4 Bronze 0 Total 9

Asian Indoor and Martial Arts Games appearances
- 2005; 2007; 2009; 2013; 2017; 2021; 2025

United Arab Emirates competed at the 2017 Asian Indoor and Martial Arts Games held in Ashgabat, Turkmenistan from September 17 to 27. UAE sent a delegation consisting of 52 competitors for the multi-sport event.

Emirati participants won 9 medals in the competition including 5 gold medals.

== Participants ==
Sport	Men	Women	Total
Ju Jitsu	14	6	20
Futsal	13	0	13
Billiards	5	0	5
Track cycling	5	0	5
Chess	2	2	4
Indoor Athletics	2	1	3
Bowling	2	0	2

== Medalists ==
Medal	Name	Sport	Event
Gold	Alia Saeed Mohammed	Indoor Athletics	Women's 3000m
Gold	Alfadhli Omar	Ju Jitsu	Men's Ne-Waza - 56 kg
Gold	Alkirbi Talib	Ju Jitsu	Men's Ne-Waza - 69 kg
Gold	Alketbi Faisa	Ju Jitsu	Men's Ne-Waza - 94 kg
Gold	Alketbi Faisa	Ju Jitsu	Men's Open weight
Silver	Almansoori Za	Ju Jitsu	Men's Ne-Waza - 62 kg
Silver	Almansoori Za	Ju Jitsu	Men's Ne-Waza - 85 kg
Silver	Almansoori Za	Ju Jitsu	Men's Ne-Waza - 94 kg
Silver	Almansoori Za	Ju Jitsu	Men's Ne-Waza - 49 kg
