= Krizziah Tabora =

Filipino bowler (born 1991)

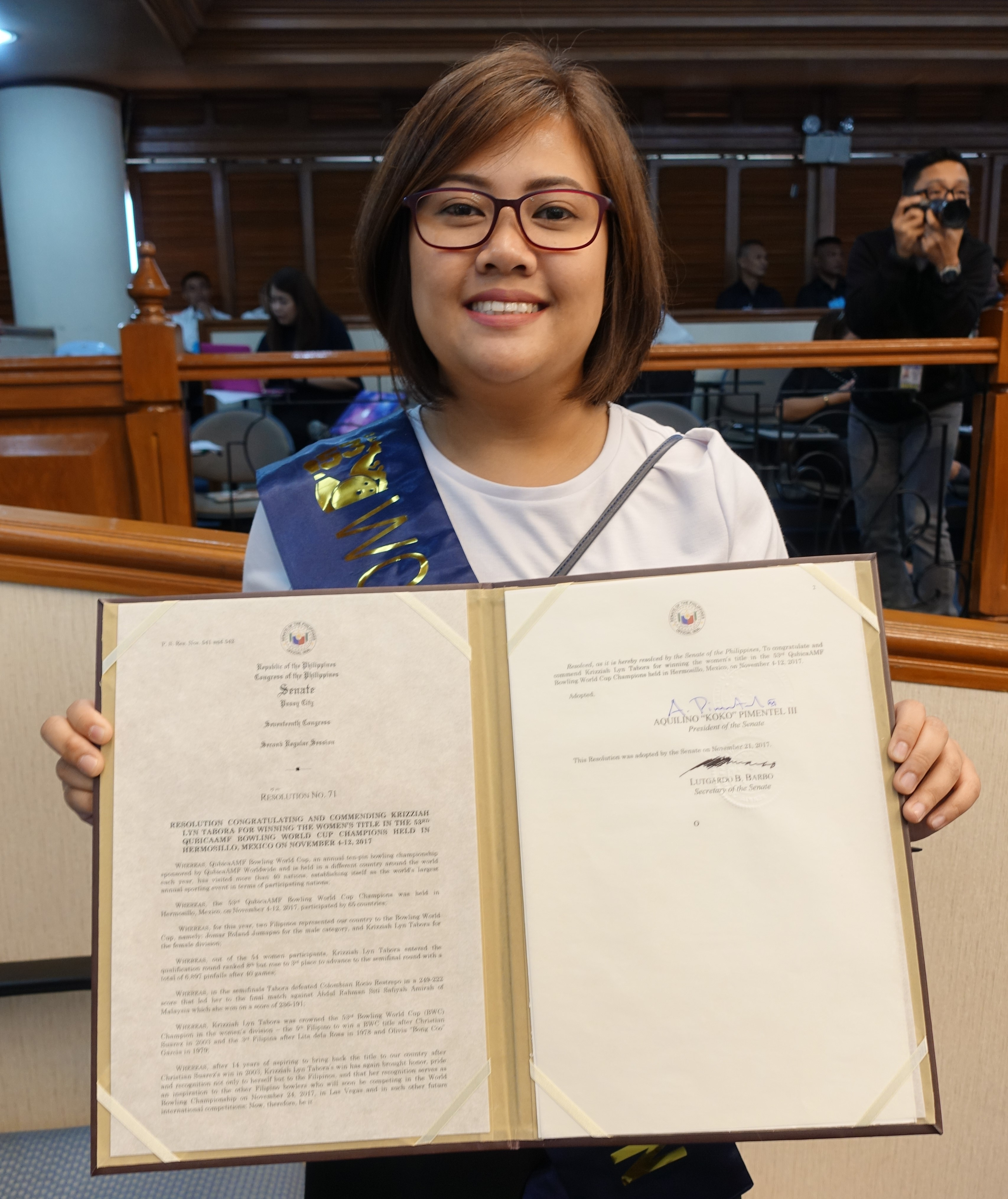
- with Senate resolution of congratulations and commendation for winning the 53rd QubicaAmf Bowling World Cup

Personal information
- Born: March 17, 1991 (age 35)
- Height: 156 cm (5 ft 1 in) (2017)
- Weight: 57 kg (126 lb) (2017)

Sport
- Country: Philippines
- Sport: Bowling
- Coached by: Paeng Nepomuceno

Achievements and titles
- World finals: 2017 QubicaAMF Bowling World Cup: Champion
Medal record
Women's Bowling
Representing Philippines
Asian Indoor and Martial Arts Games
Silver medal – second place	2017 Ashgabat	Team of four
Southeast Asian Games
Bronze medal – third place	2015 Singapore	Team of five
Bronze medal – third place	2017 Kuala Lumpur	Team of five

Krizziah Lyn Tabora (born March 17, 1991) is a Filipino bowler who represents the Philippines in international bowling competitions.

== Career ==
Tabora competed at the 2016 Asian Intercity Bowling Championship in Jakarta, Indonesia. She along with Lara Posadas won a silver medal the women's double event. The two along with two other bowlers, Anne Marie Kiac and Maria Lourdes Arles, won a gold medal at the women's team event for the Philippines besting the teams from Singapore and China which won silver and bronze respectively.

At the 2017 Southeast Asian Games, Tabora, Posadas with Marie Alexis Sy, Dyan Coronacion and Maria Liza Del Rosario won a bronze at the women's team of five event. All five save for Coronacion also won the bronze in the same event for the 2015 edition.

The Philippine team of four for the 2017 Asian Indoor and Martial Arts Games which consisted of Tabora, Posadas, Sy and Del Rosario, settled for the silver medal after they lost to South Korea in the final.

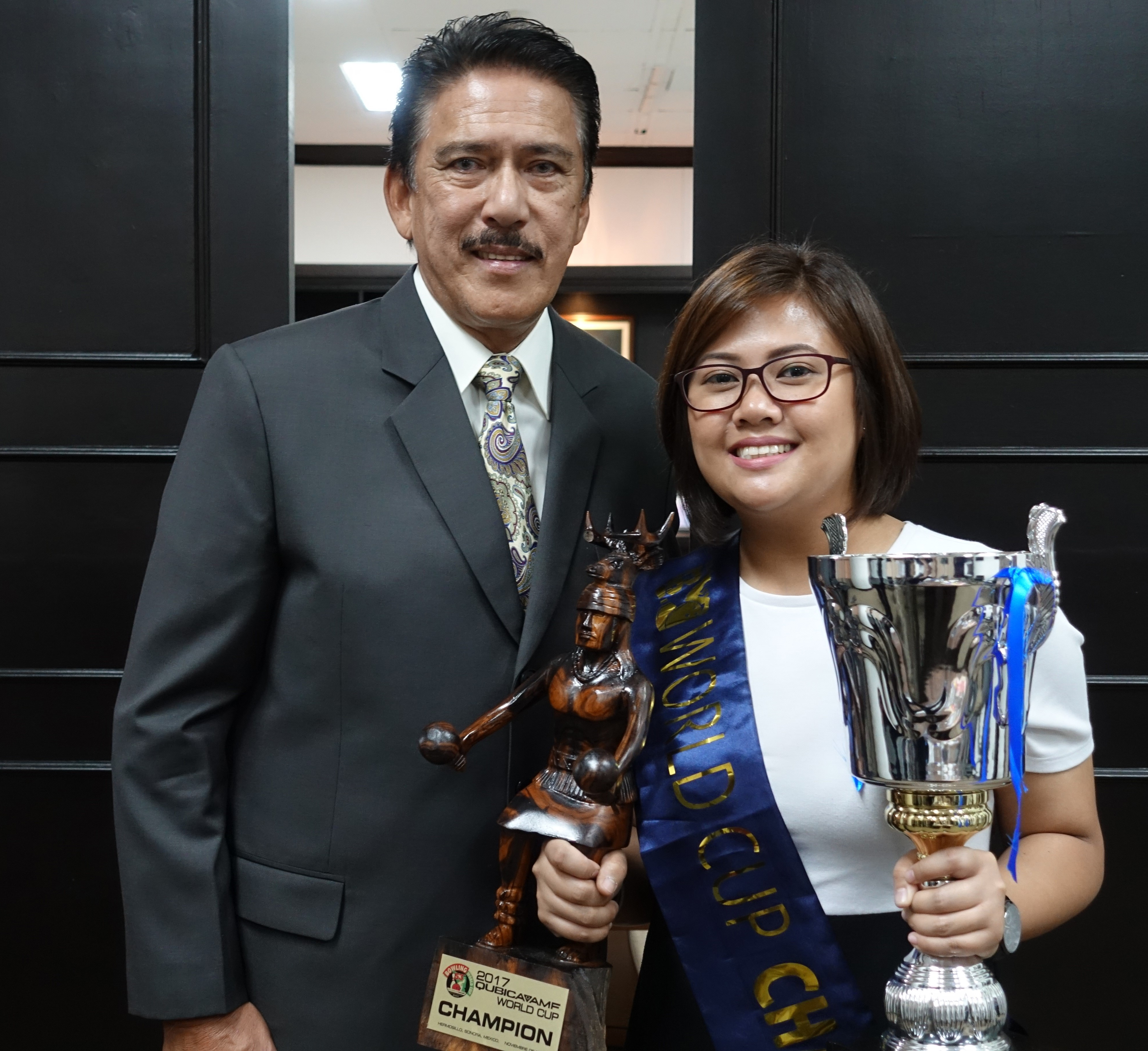
Krizziah Tabora with SP Vicente Sotto III before presentation of Senate resolution.

Tabora became the women's champion in the 2017 QubicaAMF Bowling World Cup after she secured a 236-191 victory over Siti Safiyah of Malaysia in the final. She is the fifth bowler representing the Philippines to win at the Bowling World Cup and her title is the eight for the Philippines overall.
