= Qatar at the 2017 Asian Indoor and Martial Arts Games =

- IOC code: QAT
- Website: {{URL|example.com|optional display text}}

in Ashgabat 17–27 September
- Competitors: 45 in 9 sports
- Medals: Gold 4 Silver 4 Bronze 3 Total 11

Asian Indoor and Martial Arts Games appearances
- 2005; 2007; 2009; 2013; 2017; 2021; 2025

Qatar competed at the 2017 Asian Indoor and Martial Arts Games in Ashgabat, Turkmenistan from September 17 to 27. Qatar won 11 medals during the multi-sport event including 4 gold medals. Qatari delegation claimed 6 medals in 6 different team events.

== 3x3 Basketball ==
Qatar men's national 3x3 basketball team secured the gold medal after emerging as the champions in the men's category by beating Iraq with a score of 22–12 in the finals. Qatari basketball team emerged as unbeaten winners in the tournament.

== Participants ==
Sport	Men	Women	Total
3x3 basketball	4	0	4
Cue sports	5	0	5
Bowling	4	0	4
Chess	4	1	5
Equestrian jumping	5	0	5
Indoor Athletics	11	0	11
Short course swimming	8	0	8
Weightlifting	1	0	1
Taekwondo	2	0	2

== Medallists ==
Medal	Name	Sport	Event
Gold	Qatar national 3x3 team	3x3 basketball	Men's tournament
Gold	Hassan Abdalelah Haroun	Indoor Athletics	Men's 400m
Gold	Al Attiayah Hamad Ali	Equestrian jumping	Men's individual
Gold	Hairane Jamal	Indoor Athletics	Men's 800m
Silver	Qatar 4 × 400 m relay team	Indoor Athletics	Men's 4 × 400 m relay
Silver	Qatar national billiards team	Billiards	Men's team
Silver	Qatar men's national bowling team	Bowling	Men's team of four
Silver	Qatar national equestrian team	Equestrian jumping	Men's team
Bronze	Qatar national chess team	Chess	Men's rapid team
Bronze	Al Mannai Rashid Ahmed	Indoor Athletics	Men's triple jump
Bronze	Alaraimi Ali Juma	Taekwondo	Men's 80 kg
