= Maksat Atabayev =

Turkmenistani chess grandmaster (born 1994)

Personal information
- Born: November 28, 1994 (age 31) Gypjak, Turkmenistan

Chess career
- Country: Turkmenistan
- Title: Grandmaster (2015)
- Peak rating: 2519 (April 2017)

Maksat Atabayev (born November 28, 1994) is the FIDE Arbiter/Trainer from Turkmenistan. He was the FIDE Master (FM) in 2010, International Master (IM) 2012 and Grandmaster (GM) in 2015.

== Notable tournaments ==
Tournament Name	Year	ELO	Points
FSGM May 2016(Budapest HUN)	2016	2483	7.0
