= Paulo Bersamina =

Filipino chess player (born 1998)

- Bersamina in 2026

Personal information
- Born: February 1, 1998 (age 28) Manila, Philippines

Chess career
- Country: Philippines
- Title: International Master (2014)
- FIDE rating: 2418 (November 2026)
- Peak rating: 2462 (January 2020)

Paulo Bersamina (born February 1, 1998) is a Filipino chess player. He was awarded the title of International Master (IM) by FIDE in 2014.

He has represented Philippines in the Chess Olympiad, including 2014 (where he finished with 5/9 on board 4) and 2016 (2.5/5 on board 5).

He qualified to play for the Chess World Cup 2021 where he was defeated 1.5-0.5 by R. Praggnanandhaa in the first round.
