= Hong Kong at the 2017 Asian Indoor and Martial Arts Games =

- Flag of Hong Kong
- IOC code: HKG

Asian Indoor and Martial Arts Games appearances
- 2005; 2007; 2009; 2013; 2017; 2021; 2025

Hong Kong competed at the 2017 Asian Indoor and Martial Arts Games held in Ashgabat, Turkmenistan.

== Medal summary ==
=== Medalists ===
Medal	Name	Sport	Event
Gold	Lui Lai Yiu	Indoor athletics	Women's 60 m hurdles
Bronze	Cheung Wang Fung	Indoor athletics	Men's 60 m hurdles
Bronze	Chan Ming Tai	Indoor athletics	Men's long jump
Bronze	Yeung Man Wai	Indoor athletics	Women's high jump
Bronze	Wong Chun Hun; Wong Hong Kit	Tennis	Men's doubles
