= South Korea at the 2017 Asian Indoor and Martial Arts Games =

- Flag of South Korea
- IOC code: KOR

Asian Indoor and Martial Arts Games appearances
- 2005; 2007; 2009; 2013; 2017; 2021; 2025

South Korea competed at the 2017 Asian Indoor and Martial Arts Games held in Ashgabat, Turkmenistan.

== Medal summary ==
=== Medalists ===
Medal	Name	Sport	Event
Silver	Lee Jung-joon	Indoor athletics	Men's 60 m hurdles
Bronze	An Si-sung	Weightlifting	Women's 63 kg
Bronze	Jung Il-woo	Indoor athletics	Men's shot put
