= Vietnam at the 2017 Asian Indoor and Martial Arts Games =

- IOC code: VIE
- NOC: Vietnam Olympic Committee
- Website: www.voc.org.vn (in Vietnamese and English)

in Ashgabat
- Competitors: 103 in 13 sports
- Medals Ranked 9th: Gold 13 Silver 8 Bronze 19 Total 40

Asian Indoor and Martial Arts Games appearances
- 2005; 2007; 2009; 2013; 2017; 2021; 2025

Vietnam participated in the 2017 Asian Indoor and Martial Arts Games in Ashgabat, Turkmenistan on 17 September – 27 September 2017.

Vietnam sent 103 athletes to compete in 13 sports.

== Medalists ==
Medal	Name	Sport	Event
Gold	Nguyen Quoc Nguyen	Cue Sports	Men's 3-Cushion Carom Singles
Gold	Chess Team	Chess	Men's Rapid Team
Gold	Le Quang Liem	Chess	Men's Standard Individual
Gold	Nguyen Trung Kien & Pham Hong Anh	DanceSport	Salsa
Gold	Nguyen Tien Trong	Indoor Athletics	Men's Long Jump
Gold	Tran thi Thanh Thuy	Kurash	Women's +87kg
Gold	Bui Yen Ly	MuayThai	Women's -51kg
Gold	Nguyen thi Anh Vien	Short Course Swimming	Women's 100m Individual Medley
Gold	Nguyen thi Anh Vien	Short Course Swimming	Women's 200m Individual Medley
Gold	Women Team	Taekwondo	Women's Team Poomsae
Gold	Thach Kim Tuan	Weightlifting	Men's 56kg
Gold	Trinh Van Vinh	Weightlifting	Men's 62kg
