= Kickboxing at the 2017 Asian Indoor and Martial Arts Games =

- Venue: Ashgabat Muay Kickboxing Arena
- Dates: 23–26 September 2017

Kickboxing at the 2017 Asian Indoor and Martial Arts Games was held at the Muay Kickboxing Arena in Ashgabat, Turkmenistan from 23 to 26 September 2017.

== Medalists ==
=== Kick light ===
Event	Gold	Silver	Bronze
Men's −69 kg	Merdan Mamedow; Turkmenistan	Sanžarbek Sapaýew; Turkmenistan	Aibek Duishembiev; Kyrgyzstan
Men's −69 kg	Merdan Mamedow; Turkmenistan	Sanžarbek Sapaýew; Turkmenistan	Siyovush Ibragimov; Tajikistan
Men's −74 kg	Hajymyrat Geldimämmedow; Turkmenistan	Farhod Rasulov; Tajikistan	Said Fakirow; Turkmenistan
Men's −74 kg	Hajymyrat Geldimämmedow; Turkmenistan	Farhod Rasulov; Tajikistan	Davoud Mousavi; Iran
Women's −60 kg	Mijgona Samadova; Tajikistan	Gülzada Jorakulyýewa; Turkmenistan	Zeinab Jabbari; Iran
Women's −60 kg	Mijgona Samadova; Tajikistan	Gülzada Jorakulyýewa; Turkmenistan	Tseng Ching-yu; Chinese Taipei

=== Point fighting ===
Event	Gold	Silver	Bronze
Men's −69 kg	Mostafa Pourfaraj; Iran	Haidar Mohammed; Iraq	Chyngyz Kalbaev; Kyrgyzstan
Men's −69 kg	Mostafa Pourfaraj; Iran	Haidar Mohammed; Iraq	Khumoyun Farmonov; Uzbekistan
Men's −79 kg	Mohammad Pourfaraj; Iran	Jakhongir Khusanov; Uzbekistan	Daler Tyuryaev; Tajikistan
Men's −79 kg	Mohammad Pourfaraj; Iran	Jakhongir Khusanov; Uzbekistan	Şatlyk Allakow; Turkmenistan
Women's −59 kg	Shahnaz Mirheidari; Iran	Maýsa Gupbykowa; Turkmenistan	Aigerim Rakhatova; Kazakhstan
Women's −59 kg	Shahnaz Mirheidari; Iran	Maýsa Gupbykowa; Turkmenistan	Fotima Kholova; Tajikistan

=== Full contact ===
Event	Gold	Silver	Bronze
Men's −57 kg	Avazbek Amanbekov; Kyrgyzstan	Pygy Silabow; Turkmenistan	Ibrahim Juma; Jordan
Men's −57 kg	Avazbek Amanbekov; Kyrgyzstan	Pygy Silabow; Turkmenistan	Ibrahim Al-Hasan; Syria
Men's −67 kg	Maxat Ussip; Kazakhstan	Mekan Amanow; Turkmenistan	Hamid Amni; Iran
Men's −67 kg	Maxat Ussip; Kazakhstan	Mekan Amanow; Turkmenistan	Aday Abuhasoah; Jordan
Men's −75 kg	Rikan Lateef; Iraq	Hossein Karami; Iran	Maaz Khan; Pakistan
Men's −75 kg	Rikan Lateef; Iraq	Hossein Karami; Iran	Ali Khalaf Hasan; Jordan
Women's −56 kg	Akerke Nauryzbayeva; Kazakhstan	Fatemeh Alizadeh; Iran	Iuliia Borisova; Kyrgyzstan
Women's −56 kg	Akerke Nauryzbayeva; Kazakhstan	Fatemeh Alizadeh; Iran	Farida Kutlimuradowa; Turkmenistan

=== Low kick ===
Event	Gold	Silver	Bronze
Men's −51 kg	Omid Ahmadi Safa; Iran	Abdul-Khaliq Sabih; Iraq	Akram Baratov; Kyrgyzstan
Men's −51 kg	Omid Ahmadi Safa; Iran	Abdul-Khaliq Sabih; Iraq	Hamza Abughazleh; Jordan
Men's −63.5 kg	None awarded	Aleksey Fedoseev; Kyrgyzstan	Iraj Moradi; Iran
Men's −63.5 kg	None awarded	Aleksey Fedoseev; Kyrgyzstan	Feng Tianhao; China
Men's −71 kg	Goçmyrat Jumanyýazow; Turkmenistan	Yuan Bing; China	Ali Baniasad; Iran
Men's −71 kg	Goçmyrat Jumanyýazow; Turkmenistan	Yuan Bing; China	Şöhrat Ýagmyrow; Turkmenistan
Men's −81 kg	Mahmoud Sattari; Iran	Javokhir Elboev; Uzbekistan	Mohammad Salama; Jordan
Men's −81 kg	Mahmoud Sattari; Iran	Javokhir Elboev; Uzbekistan	Wael Al-Saed; Syria
Women's −52 kg	Li Yueyao; China	Zuhro Kholova; Tajikistan	Sereenengiin Möngöngerel; Mongolia
Women's −52 kg	Li Yueyao; China	Zuhro Kholova; Tajikistan	Saýýara Bahramowa; Turkmenistan

== Medal table ==
Rank	Nation	Gold	Silver	Bronze	Total
1	Iran (IRI)	5	2	5	12
2	Turkmenistan (TKM)	3	5	5	13
3	Kazakhstan (KAZ)	2	0	1	3
4	Tajikistan (TJK)	1	2	3	6
5	Iraq (IRQ)	1	2	0	3
6	Kyrgyzstan (KGZ)	1	1	4	6
7	China (CHN)	1	1	1	3
8	Uzbekistan (UZB)	0	2	1	3
9	Jordan (JOR)	0	0	5	5
10	Syria (SYR)	0	0	2	2
11	Chinese Taipei (TPE)	0	0	1	1
11	Mongolia (MGL)	0	0	1	1
11	Pakistan (PAK)	0	0	1	1
Totals (13 entries)		14	15	30	59

== Results ==
=== Kick light ===
==== Men's 69 kg ====
Round of 16; 23 September
Dibash Shrestha (NEP)	0
Liang Chia-chen (TPE)	3
Mostafa Pourfaraj (IRI)	0
Murtadha Habeeb (IRQ)	2

Quarterfinals; 24 September
Aibek Duishembiev (KGZ)	3
Mohannad Afaneh (JOR)	0
Sanžarbek Sapaýew (TKM)	3
Liang Chia-chen (TPE)	0
Merdan Mamedow (TKM)	2
Murtadha Habeeb (IRQ)	1
Ruzimurod Turotkulov (UZB)
Siyovush Ibragimov (TJK)	RET

Semifinals; 25 September
Aibek Duishembiev (KGZ)	0
Sanžarbek Sapaýew (TKM)	3
Merdan Mamedow (TKM)	2
Siyovush Ibragimov (TJK)	1

Final; 25 September
Sanžarbek Sapaýew (TKM)	0
Merdan Mamedow (TKM)	3

==== Men's 74 kg ====
Round of 16; 23 September
Kelechek Orosbek Uulu (KGZ)	0
Said Fakirow (TKM)	3
Atif Altaf (PAK)	0
Umarjon Alibekov (UZB)	3

Quarterfinals; 24 September
Farhod Rasulov (TJK)	3
Nikesh Shrestha (NEP)	0
Said Fakirow (TKM)	2
Ibraheem Jabir (IRQ)	1
Davoud Mousavi (IRI)	3
Umarjon Alibekov (UZB)	0
Main Al-Btoosh (JOR)	0
Hajymyrat Geldimämmedow (TKM)	3

Semifinals; 25 September
Farhod Rasulov (TJK)	2
Said Fakirow (TKM)	1
Davoud Mousavi (IRI)	1
Hajymyrat Geldimämmedow (TKM)	2

Final; 26 September
Farhod Rasulov (TJK)	0
Hajymyrat Geldimämmedow (TKM)	3

==== Women's 60 kg ====
Quarterfinals; 23 September		Semifinals; 25 September		Final; 25 September
Maýsa Gupbykowa (TKM)	0
Mijgona Samadova (TJK)	3	Mijgona Samadova (TJK)	2
Shara Khamzina (KAZ)	0	Zeinab Jabbari (IRI)	1
Zeinab Jabbari (IRI)	3			Mijgona Samadova (TJK)	2
Sabina Kim (UZB)	0			Gülzada Jorakulyýewa (TKM)	1
Gülzada Jorakulyýewa (TKM)	3	Gülzada Jorakulyýewa (TKM)	3
Tseng Ching-yu (TPE)	2	Tseng Ching-yu (TPE)	0
Shahnaz Mirheidari (IRI)	1

=== Point fighting ===
==== Men's 69 kg ====
Round of 16; 23 September
Chyngyz Kalbaev (KGZ)	11
Abdul Samad (PAK)	1
Khumoyun Farmonov (UZB)	10
Liang Chia-chen (TPE)	4
Omar Aburub (JOR)	13
Rüstem Annaorazow (TKM)	11

Quarterfinals; 24 September
Alisher Akhmedov (TJK)	6
Mostafa Pourfaraj (IRI)	9
Diýar Hojaýew (TKM)	2
Chyngyz Kalbaev (KGZ)	4
Dibash Shrestha (NEP)	0
Khumoyun Farmonov (UZB)	10
Omar Aburub (JOR)	11
Haidar Mohammed (IRQ)	13

Semifinals; 25 September
Mostafa Pourfaraj (IRI)	7
Chyngyz Kalbaev (KGZ)	4
Khumoyun Farmonov (UZB)	8
Haidar Mohammed (IRQ)	9

Final; 25 September
Mostafa Pourfaraj (IRI)	11
Haidar Mohammed (IRQ)	2

==== Men's 79 kg ====
Round of 16; 24 September
Ali Kareem (IRQ)	9
Jelal Satlykgulyýew (TKM)	13
Abdul Raqib Azimi (AFG)
Jakhongir Khusanov (UZB)	WO
Yousef Qawasmeh (JOR)	13
Shafiq-ur-Rehman (PAK)	3

Quarterfinals; 25 September
Daler Tyuryaev (TJK)	14
Alen Ofoio (KGZ)	4
Jelal Satlykgulyýew (TKM)	9
Mohammad Pourfaraj (IRI)	12
Nikesh Shrestha (NEP)	12
Jakhongir Khusanov (UZB)	13
Yousef Qawasmeh (JOR)	12
Şatlyk Allakow (TKM)	14

Semifinals; 25 September
Daler Tyuryaev (TJK)	4
Mohammad Pourfaraj (IRI)	6
Jakhongir Khusanov (UZB)	14
Şatlyk Allakow (TKM)	9

Final; 26 September
Mohammad Pourfaraj (IRI)	15
Jakhongir Khusanov (UZB)	5

==== Women's 59 kg ====
Quarterfinals; 23 September		Semifinals; 24 September		Final; 24 September
		Aigerim Rakhatova (KAZ)	8
		Maýsa Gupbykowa (TKM)	14
				Maýsa Gupbykowa (TKM)	0
Fotima Kholova (TJK)	13			Shahnaz Mirheidari (IRI)	10
Reham Abu Ghazaleh (JOR)	10	Fotima Kholova (TJK)	0
		Shahnaz Mirheidari (IRI)	10

=== Full contact ===
==== Men's 57 kg ====
Round of 16; 23 September
Arshad Shinwari (AFG)	0
Arnal Kanapyanov (KAZ)	3
Mohammed Mutar (IRQ)	2
Furkatbek Yokubov (UZB)	1
Ibrahim Al-Hasan (SYR)	3
Mohammad Nazif Faraji (AFG)	0
Röwşen Habyrow (TKM)	3
Bayadaagiin Mendbayar (MGL)	0

Quarterfinals; 24 September
Pygy Silabow (TKM)	3
Arnal Kanapyanov (KAZ)	0
Ibrahim Juma (JOR)	2
Mohammed Mutar (IRQ)	1
Hamed Al-Matari (YEM)	0
Ibrahim Al-Hasan (SYR)	3
Röwşen Habyrow (TKM)	0
Avazbek Amanbekov (KGZ)	3

Semifinals; 25 September
Pygy Silabow (TKM)	3
Ibrahim Juma (JOR)	0
Ibrahim Al-Hasan (SYR)	0
Avazbek Amanbekov (KGZ)	3

Final; 25 September
Pygy Silabow (TKM)	0
Avazbek Amanbekov (KGZ)	3

==== Men's 67 kg ====
Round of 16; 23 September
Muhammad Asghar (PAK)
Mekan Amanow (TKM)	KO
Sherzod Abdullaev (UZB)	1
Aday Abuhasoah (JOR)	2
Maxat Ussip (KAZ)	RSC
Mustafa Omari (AFG)

Quarterfinals; 24 September
Hamid Amni (IRI)	3
Murodzhon Kosimov (TJK)	0
Mekan Amanow (TKM)	RET
Erik Voinov (KGZ)
Amjad Hishmeh (SYR)	0
Aday Abuhasoah (JOR)	3
Maxat Ussip (KAZ)	2
Şöhrat Hallyýew (TKM)	1

Semifinals; 25 September
Hamid Amni (IRI)	0
Mekan Amanow (TKM)	3
Aday Abuhasoah (JOR)	0
Maxat Ussip (KAZ)	3

Final; 26 September
Mekan Amanow (TKM)	0
Maxat Ussip (KAZ)	3

==== Men's 75 kg ====
Quarterfinals; 23 September		Semifinals; 25 September		Final; 26 September
Hossein Karami (IRI)	3
Azamat Kudaiberdiev (KGZ)	0	Hossein Karami (IRI)	3
Maaz Khan (PAK)	2	Maaz Khan (PAK)	0
Rohollah Mohammadi (AFG)	0			Hossein Karami (IRI)	1
Sayat Trusbekov (KAZ)	0			Rikan Lateef (IRQ)	2
Ali Khalaf Hasan (JOR)	3	Ali Khalaf Hasan (JOR)	0
Oybek Abdurakhimov (UZB)	0	Rikan Lateef (IRQ)	3
Rikan Lateef (IRQ)	3

==== Women's 56 kg ====
Quarterfinals; 23 September
Fatemeh Alizadeh (IRI)	WO
Mijgona Samadova (TJK)
Iuliia Borisova (KGZ)	3
Selbi Kulyşowa (TKM)	0
Pürevjavyn Davaa (MGL)
Akerke Nauryzbayeva (KAZ)	DSQ
Samar Abdalla (SYR)	0
Farida Kutlimuradowa (TKM)	3

Semifinals; 24 September
Fatemeh Alizadeh (IRI)	2
Iuliia Borisova (KGZ)	0
Akerke Nauryzbayeva (KAZ)	2
Farida Kutlimuradowa (TKM)	1

Final; 24 September
Fatemeh Alizadeh (IRI)	1
Akerke Nauryzbayeva (KAZ)	2

=== Low kick ===
==== Men's 51 kg ====
Round of 16; 24 September
Liaqat Ali (PAK)
Robin Catalan (PHI)	DSQ

Quarterfinals; 24 September
Abdul-Khaliq Sabih (IRQ)	3
Samir Ubaidulloev (TJK)	0
Sherali Musoev (UZB)	0
Akram Baratov (KGZ)	3
Hamza Abughazleh (JOR)	2
Robin Catalan (PHI)	1
Sayed Zaki Hussaini (AFG)
Omid Ahmadi Safa (IRI)	DSQ

Semifinals; 25 September
Abdul-Khaliq Sabih (IRQ)	2
Akram Baratov (KGZ)	1
Hamza Abughazleh (JOR)
Omid Ahmadi Safa (IRI)	KO

Final; 25 September
Abdul-Khaliq Sabih (IRQ)	1
Omid Ahmadi Safa (IRI)	2

==== Men's 63.5 kg ====
Round of 16; 23 September
Muhammadjon Nasulloev (TJK)	0
Wang Jiayue (CHN)	3
Shapoor Gulbahari (AFG)	0
Ysmaýyl Ataýew (TKM)	3
Dawran Rajabi (AFG)	2
Muhammad Bilal (PAK)	0
Farkhod Abdunazarov (UZB)	0
Chingiskhan Tlemissov (KAZ)	3

Quarterfinals; 24 September
Aleksey Fedoseev (KGZ)	3
Wang Jiayue (CHN)	0
Ysmaýyl Ataýew (TKM)
Iraj Moradi (IRI)	RET
Feng Tianhao (CHN)	3
Dawran Rajabi (AFG)	0
Chingiskhan Tlemissov (KAZ)	0
Muhammet Altybaýew (TKM)	3

Semifinals; 24 September
Aleksey Fedoseev (KGZ)	3
Iraj Moradi (IRI)	0
Feng Tianhao (CHN)	0
Muhammet Altybaýew (TKM)	3

Final; 25 September
Aleksey Fedoseev (KGZ)	1
Muhammet Altybaýew (TKM)	2

- Muhammet Altybaýew of Turkmenistan originally won the gold medal, but was disqualified after he tested positive for Meldonium and Luteinizing hormone.

==== Men's 71 kg ====
Round of 16; 23 September
Sunduin Batjargal (MGL)	0
Goçmyrat Jumanyýazow (TKM)	3
Adilet Bekzhan Uulu (KGZ)	0
Muslimbek Omonov (UZB)	3
Bakytbek Shimtemir (KAZ)	RSC
Carlo Jacildo (PHI)

Quarterfinals; 24 September
Ali Baniasad (IRI)	3
Mohannad Ghassan (JOR)	0
Li Yinggang (CHN)	1
Goçmyrat Jumanyýazow (TKM)	2
Yuan Bing (CHN)	2
Muslimbek Omonov (UZB)	1
Bakytbek Shimtemir (KAZ)	1
Şöhrat Ýagmyrow (TKM)	2

Semifinals; 25 September
Ali Baniasad (IRI)	0
Goçmyrat Jumanyýazow (TKM)	3
Yuan Bing (CHN)	3
Şöhrat Ýagmyrow (TKM)	0

Final; 26 September
Goçmyrat Jumanyýazow (TKM)	2
Yuan Bing (CHN)	1

==== Men's 81 kg ====
Round of 16; 23 September
Olzhobai Kudaiberdi Uulu (KGZ)	0
Azamat Jumakulyýew (TKM)	3
Tan Xiaofeng (CHN)	0
Serdar Mämmedow (TKM)	3

Quarterfinals; 24 September
Thulfiqar Mohammed (IRQ)	1
Mohammad Salama (JOR)	2
Azamat Jumakulyýew (TKM)
Mahmoud Sattari (IRI)	KO
Wael Al-Saed (SYR)	DSQ
Serdar Mämmedow (TKM)
Javokhir Elboev (UZB)	KO
Rohullah Dehqan (AFG)

Semifinals; 25 September
Mohammad Salama (JOR)	0
Mahmoud Sattari (IRI)	3
Wael Al-Saed (SYR)
Javokhir Elboev (UZB)	WO

Final; 26 September
Mahmoud Sattari (IRI)	3
Javokhir Elboev (UZB)	0

==== Women's 52 kg ====
Round of 16; 24 September
Mubarak Kamalova (UZB)
Baktygul Abdisalamova (KGZ)	DSQ

Quarterfinals; 25 September
Atefeh Balinparast (IRI)	0
Sereenengiin Möngöngerel (MGL)	3
Li Yueyao (CHN)	3
Aýgözel Gurbangeldiýewa (TKM)	0
Saýýara Bahramowa (TKM)	2
Baktygul Abdisalamova (KGZ)	1
Zhang Luan (CHN)	1
Zuhro Kholova (TJK)	2

Semifinals; 25 September
Sereenengiin Möngöngerel (MGL)
Li Yueyao (CHN)	RSC
Saýýara Bahramowa (TKM)	0
Zuhro Kholova (TJK)	3

Final; 26 September
Li Yueyao (CHN)	3
Zuhro Kholova (TJK)	0
