= Sambo at the 2017 Asian Indoor and Martial Arts Games =

- Venue: Ashgabat Martial Arts Arena
- Dates: 24–26 September 2017

Sambo at the 2017 Asian Indoor and Martial Arts Games was held in Ashgabat, Turkmenistan from 24 to 26 September 2017 at the Martial Arts Arena.

== Medalists ==
=== Men ===
Event	Gold	Silver	Bronze
52 kg	Beimbet Kanzhanov; Kazakhstan	Khasani Dzhomii; Tajikistan	Yerbol Aldukhan; Kazakhstan
52 kg	Beimbet Kanzhanov; Kazakhstan	Khasani Dzhomii; Tajikistan	Tilek Amankulov; Kyrgyzstan
57 kg	Akmaliddin Karimov; Tajikistan	Chimeddorjiin Maral-Erdene; Mongolia	Belek Barakanov; Kyrgyzstan
57 kg	Akmaliddin Karimov; Tajikistan	Chimeddorjiin Maral-Erdene; Mongolia	Issatay Askanbay; Kazakhstan
62 kg	Yeset Kuanov; Kazakhstan	Begli Meretgeldiýew; Turkmenistan	Nozimdzhon Okhirov; Tajikistan
62 kg	Yeset Kuanov; Kazakhstan	Begli Meretgeldiýew; Turkmenistan	Arsen Kamchibekov; Kyrgyzstan
68 kg	Sarbon Ernazarov; Uzbekistan	Begmyrat Meredow; Turkmenistan	Mohammad Reza Saeidi; Iran
68 kg	Sarbon Ernazarov; Uzbekistan	Begmyrat Meredow; Turkmenistan	Muhammet Kössekow; Turkmenistan
74 kg	Behruzi Khojazoda; Tajikistan	Muboriz Munavarov; Tajikistan	Kasym Populow; Turkmenistan
74 kg	Behruzi Khojazoda; Tajikistan	Muboriz Munavarov; Tajikistan	Galymzhan Abdrakhmanov; Kazakhstan
82 kg	None awarded	Zafar Olimshoev; Tajikistan	Ulugbek Rakhmonov; Uzbekistan
82 kg	None awarded	Zafar Olimshoev; Tajikistan	Nurberdihan Orazmämmedow; Turkmenistan
90 kg	Nemat Yokubov; Uzbekistan	Ruslan Esgerow; Turkmenistan	Umed Khasanbekov; Tajikistan
90 kg	Nemat Yokubov; Uzbekistan	Ruslan Esgerow; Turkmenistan	Iraj Amirkhani; Iran

=== Men's combat ===
Event	Gold	Silver	Bronze
52 kg	Ýeňiş Merdanow; Turkmenistan	Nowruz Ataýew; Turkmenistan	Tolmas Tukliev; Uzbekistan
52 kg	Ýeňiş Merdanow; Turkmenistan	Nowruz Ataýew; Turkmenistan	Mukhametali Ergeshev; Kyrgyzstan
57 kg	Ahmet Taňryberdiýew; Turkmenistan	Rakhmatjon Akhmedov; Uzbekistan	Gantömöriin Bayanduuren; Mongolia
57 kg	Ahmet Taňryberdiýew; Turkmenistan	Rakhmatjon Akhmedov; Uzbekistan	Lutfilla Saydamatov; Uzbekistan
62 kg	Kerimberdi Döwletow; Turkmenistan	Orozbek Abtandil Uulu; Kyrgyzstan	Ulugbek Khakimov; Uzbekistan
62 kg	Kerimberdi Döwletow; Turkmenistan	Orozbek Abtandil Uulu; Kyrgyzstan	Amandyk Assauuly; Kazakhstan
68 kg	Zafar Allabergenov; Uzbekistan	Nurgeldy Kiyalbekov; Kazakhstan	Abdylla Babaýew; Turkmenistan
68 kg	Zafar Allabergenov; Uzbekistan	Nurgeldy Kiyalbekov; Kazakhstan	Alaibek Umotov; Kyrgyzstan
74 kg	Beknazar Raiymkul Uulu; Kyrgyzstan	Assylbek Smailov; Kazakhstan	Istam Kudratov; Uzbekistan
74 kg	Beknazar Raiymkul Uulu; Kyrgyzstan	Assylbek Smailov; Kazakhstan	Salmoorbek Mamatemin Uulu; Kyrgyzstan
82 kg	Jawlanbek Madaminow; Turkmenistan	Temirlan Ikhsangaliyev; Kazakhstan	Faridun Odilov; Tajikistan
82 kg	Jawlanbek Madaminow; Turkmenistan	Temirlan Ikhsangaliyev; Kazakhstan	Elgün Soltanow; Turkmenistan
90 kg	Zhanybek Amatov; Kyrgyzstan	Serdar Hojamuhammedow; Turkmenistan	Sanjar Nematov; Uzbekistan
90 kg	Zhanybek Amatov; Kyrgyzstan	Serdar Hojamuhammedow; Turkmenistan	Raikhan Madi; Kazakhstan
100 kg	Çarymyrat Annagurbanow; Turkmenistan	Daniiar Alymzhanov; Kyrgyzstan	Islomjon Azimov; Uzbekistan
100 kg	Çarymyrat Annagurbanow; Turkmenistan	Daniiar Alymzhanov; Kyrgyzstan	Ulukbek Mamytov; Kyrgyzstan
+100 kg	Zafar Madaminow; Turkmenistan	Olim Khudaykulov; Uzbekistan	Maksat Musabaev; Kyrgyzstan
+100 kg	Zafar Madaminow; Turkmenistan	Olim Khudaykulov; Uzbekistan	Milad Shiri; Iran

=== Women ===
Event	Gold	Silver	Bronze
48 kg	Aizhan Zhylkybayeva; Kazakhstan	Aitkul Abdyldabek Kyzy; Kyrgyzstan	Nodira Gulova; Uzbekistan
48 kg	Aizhan Zhylkybayeva; Kazakhstan	Aitkul Abdyldabek Kyzy; Kyrgyzstan	Zhadyra Paiyz; Kazakhstan
52 kg	Gülbadam Babamuratowa; Turkmenistan	Gulnur Yerbolova; Kazakhstan	Hurma Abdyýewa; Turkmenistan
52 kg	Gülbadam Babamuratowa; Turkmenistan	Gulnur Yerbolova; Kazakhstan	Sampilyn Solongogerel; Mongolia
56 kg	Ruşana Nurjawowa; Turkmenistan	Davaadorjiin Bolor-Erdene; Mongolia	Mähri Akmyradowa; Turkmenistan
56 kg	Ruşana Nurjawowa; Turkmenistan	Davaadorjiin Bolor-Erdene; Mongolia	Malikabonu Mirzaeva; Uzbekistan
60 kg	Azhar Kenbeil; Kazakhstan	Akkal Otebek; Kazakhstan	Gulnoza Ziyaeva; Uzbekistan
60 kg	Azhar Kenbeil; Kazakhstan	Akkal Otebek; Kazakhstan	Titapa Junsookplung; Thailand
64 kg	Dinara Zhumabayeva; Kazakhstan	Zyba Orunowa; Turkmenistan	Irina Kulakova; Uzbekistan
64 kg	Dinara Zhumabayeva; Kazakhstan	Zyba Orunowa; Turkmenistan	Mutiara Amanda; Indonesia
68 kg	Dildash Kuryshbayeva; Kazakhstan	Markhabat Kuatbekova; Kazakhstan	Saitan Somching; Thailand
68 kg	Dildash Kuryshbayeva; Kazakhstan	Markhabat Kuatbekova; Kazakhstan	Gulmira Ismatova; Uzbekistan
72 kg	Zere Bektaskyzy; Kazakhstan	Tsogt-Ochiryn Battsetseg; Mongolia	Läle Nuryýewa; Turkmenistan
72 kg	Zere Bektaskyzy; Kazakhstan	Tsogt-Ochiryn Battsetseg; Mongolia	Dilafruz Ýusupowa; Turkmenistan

== Medal table ==
Rank	Nation	Gold	Silver	Bronze	Total
1	Turkmenistan (TKM)	8	6	9	23
2	Kazakhstan (KAZ)	7	6	6	19
3	Uzbekistan (UZB)	3	2	12	17
4	Kyrgyzstan (KGZ)	2	3	8	13
5	Tajikistan (TJK)	2	3	3	8
6	Mongolia (MGL)	0	3	2	5
7	Iran (IRI)	0	0	3	3
8	Thailand (THA)	0	0	2	2
9	Indonesia (INA)	0	0	1	1
Totals (9 entries)		22	23	46	91

== Results ==
=== Men ===
==== 52 kg ====
24 September

1/8 finals
Ýagmyr Orazdurdyýew (TKM)	0
Yerbol Aldukhan (KAZ)	3

Quarterfinals
Yerbol Aldukhan (KAZ)	0
Khasani Dzhomii (TJK)	4
Sattor Ergashev (UZB)	2
Sayed Qadam Hashimi (AFG)	0
Beimbet Kanzhanov (KAZ)	5
Tilek Amankulov (KGZ)	0
Chatchai Ritthidecha (THA)	0
Maksudjan Awliýakulyýew (TKM)	8

Semifinals
Khasani Dzhomii (TJK)	3
Sattor Ergashev (UZB)	2
Beimbet Kanzhanov (KAZ)	9
Maksudjan Awliýakulyýew (TKM)	0

Final
Khasani Dzhomii (TJK)	1
Beimbet Kanzhanov (KAZ)	2

Repechage round 2
Yerbol Aldukhan (KAZ)	7
Sayed Qadam Hashimi (AFG)	0
Tilek Amankulov (KGZ)	1
Chatchai Ritthidecha (THA)	0

Repechage bronze
Yerbol Aldukhan (KAZ)	SUB
Maksudjan Awliýakulyýew (TKM)
Tilek Amankulov (KGZ)	7
Sattor Ergashev (UZB)	1

==== 57 kg ====
25 September

1/8 finals
Hydyr Allaberdiýew (TKM)	1
Issatay Askanbay (KAZ)	3
Lutfilla Saydamatov (UZB)	8
Puriwat Supapitakpong (THA)	0
Doolot Sadyrkulov (KGZ)	6
Mohammed Ismael (IRQ)	1
Munir Ghusn (SYR)	1
Kerim Allanurow (TKM)	3
Rakhmatjon Akhmedov (UZB)	0
Akmaliddin Karimov (TJK)	9
Zubair Joyenda (AFG)	0
Belek Barakanov (KGZ)	8

Quarterfinals
Issatay Askanbay (KAZ)	SUB
Lutfilla Saydamatov (UZB)
Doolot Sadyrkulov (KGZ)	1
Chimeddorjiin Maral-Erdene (MGL)	9
Kerim Allanurow (TKM)	2
Akmaliddin Karimov (TJK)	4
Belek Barakanov (KGZ)	5
Adilet Sayazhanov (KAZ)	0

Semifinals
Issatay Askanbay (KAZ)	0
Chimeddorjiin Maral-Erdene (MGL)	3
Akmaliddin Karimov (TJK)	8
Belek Barakanov (KGZ)	3

Final
Chimeddorjiin Maral-Erdene (MGL)	1
Akmaliddin Karimov (TJK)	2

Repechage round 1
Hydyr Allaberdiýew (TKM)	0
Lutfilla Saydamatov (UZB)	1
Rakhmatjon Akhmedov (UZB)	0
Kerim Allanurow (TKM)	1
Zubair Joyenda (AFG)	0
Adilet Sayazhanov (KAZ)	1

Repechage round 2
Lutfilla Saydamatov (UZB)	1
Doolot Sadyrkulov (KGZ)	4
Kerim Allanurow (TKM)
Adilet Sayazhanov (KAZ)	SUB

Repechage bronze
Doolot Sadyrkulov (KGZ)	1
Belek Barakanov (KGZ)	2
Adilet Sayazhanov (KAZ)	1
Issatay Askanbay (KAZ)	3

==== 62 kg ====
26 September

1/8 finals
Almas Suleimenov (KAZ)	8
Joe Haddad (LBN)	1
Gankhuyagiin Mönkhbat (MGL)	1
Begli Meretgeldiýew (TKM)	10
Sorbon Latifov (TJK)	3
Jasurbek Khudoyberdiev (UZB)	1
Sapar Döwletow (TKM)	SUB
Mohamad Wahyudi (INA)
Ali Khousrof (YEM)	1
Yeset Kuanov (KAZ)	8

Quarterfinals
Almas Suleimenov (KAZ)	0
Begli Meretgeldiýew (TKM)	4
Sorbon Latifov (TJK)
Bye
Sapar Döwletow (TKM)
Yeset Kuanov (KAZ)	SUB
Nozimdzhon Okhirov (TJK)	2
Arsen Kamchibekov (KGZ)	0

Semifinals
Begli Meretgeldiýew (TKM)	3
Sorbon Latifov (TJK)	1
Yeset Kuanov (KAZ)	7
Nozimdzhon Okhirov (TJK)	3

Final
Begli Meretgeldiýew (TKM)	0
Yeset Kuanov (KAZ)	3

Repechage round 1
Gankhuyagiin Mönkhbat (MGL)	7
Almas Suleimenov (KAZ)	2
Jasurbek Khudoyberdiev (UZB)
Bye
Ali Khousrof (YEM)
Sapar Döwletow (TKM)	SUB

Repechage round 2
Gankhuyagiin Mönkhbat (MGL)	2
Jasurbek Khudoyberdiev (UZB)	8
Sapar Döwletow (TKM)
Arsen Kamchibekov (KGZ)	WD

Repechage bronze
Jasurbek Khudoyberdiev (UZB)	2
Nozimdzhon Okhirov (TJK)	3
Arsen Kamchibekov (KGZ)	1
Sorbon Latifov (TJK)	0

==== 68 kg ====
24 September

1/8 finals
Ahmad Sulaiman Samak (AFG)
Mohammad Reza Saeidi (IRI)	TT
Ihsan Falah (IRQ)
Muhammet Kössekow (TKM)	TT
Artur Te (KGZ)	1
Sarbon Ernazarov (UZB)	6
Lavan Kumar (IND)
Raakhanjavyn Tseden-Ish (MGL)	TT
Ryenchindorjiin Altannaran (MGL)	TT
Arthit Khuansathan (THA)
Syarif Hidayatullah (INA)
Eldos Masiev (KGZ)	TT
Ghady Moussa (LBN)
Begmyrat Meredow (TKM)	TT

Quarterfinals
Mohammad Reza Saeidi (IRI)
Muhammet Kössekow (TKM)	TT
Sarbon Ernazarov (UZB)	1
Raakhanjavyn Tseden-Ish (MGL)	0
Ryenchindorjiin Altannaran (MGL)	1
Eldos Masiev (KGZ)	5
Begmyrat Meredow (TKM)	4
Tolegen Nurgaliyev (KAZ)	1

Semifinals
Muhammet Kössekow (TKM)	1
Sarbon Ernazarov (UZB)	1
Eldos Masiev (KGZ)	1
Begmyrat Meredow (TKM)	4

Final
Sarbon Ernazarov (UZB)	1
Begmyrat Meredow (TKM)	1

Repechage round 1
Ihsan Falah (IRQ)
Mohammad Reza Saeidi (IRI)	WO
Artur Te (KGZ)	1
Raakhanjavyn Tseden-Ish (MGL)	0
Syarif Hidayatullah (INA)	0
Ryenchindorjiin Altannaran (MGL)	5
Ghady Moussa (LBN)
Tolegen Nurgaliyev (KAZ)	SUB

Repechage round 2
Mohammad Reza Saeidi (IRI)	3
Artur Te (KGZ)	2
Ryenchindorjiin Altannaran (MGL)	3
Tolegen Nurgaliyev (KAZ)	0

Repechage bronze
Mohammad Reza Saeidi (IRI)	9
Eldos Masiev (KGZ)	7
Ryenchindorjiin Altannaran (MGL)	2
Muhammet Kössekow (TKM)	3

==== 74 kg ====
25 September

1/8 finals
Galymzhan Abdrakhmanov (KAZ)	8
Elias Haddad (LBN)	0
Nuriddinjon Tilavoldiev (UZB)	1
Yousef Karimian (IRI)	0
Tsend-Ayuushiin Janlavtsogzol (MGL)	0
Rahat Bäşimow (TKM)	9
Behruzi Khojazoda (TJK)	8
Jasim Qaddoori (IRQ)	0
Yeldar Beisembayev (KAZ)	1
Muboriz Munavarov (TJK)	6
Mohanad Sham (SYR)
Istam Kudratov (UZB)	SUB
Kaiwit Phuengsook (THA)	0
Kasym Populow (TKM)	8

Quarterfinals
Galymzhan Abdrakhmanov (KAZ)	1
Nuriddinjon Tilavoldiev (UZB)	0
Rahat Bäşimow (TKM)	0
Behruzi Khojazoda (TJK)	3
Muboriz Munavarov (TJK)	3
Istam Kudratov (UZB)	1
Kasym Populow (TKM)	TT
Urmat Mambetzhan Uulu (KGZ)

Semifinals
Galymzhan Abdrakhmanov (KAZ)	1
Behruzi Khojazoda (TJK)	3
Muboriz Munavarov (TJK)	1
Kasym Populow (TKM)	1

Final
Behruzi Khojazoda (TJK)	1
Muboriz Munavarov (TJK)	1

Repechage round 1
Elias Haddad (LBN)	0
Nuriddinjon Tilavoldiev (UZB)	8
Jasim Qaddoori (IRQ)
Rahat Bäşimow (TKM)	SUB
Yeldar Beisembayev (KAZ)	1
Istam Kudratov (UZB)	0
Kaiwit Phuengsook (THA)
Urmat Mambetzhan Uulu (KGZ)	TT

Repechage round 2
Nuriddinjon Tilavoldiev (UZB)	1
Rahat Bäşimow (TKM)	2
Yeldar Beisembayev (KAZ)	0
Urmat Mambetzhan Uulu (KGZ)	3

Repechage bronze
Rahat Bäşimow (TKM)	1
Kasym Populow (TKM)	1
Urmat Mambetzhan Uulu (KGZ)	1
Galymzhan Abdrakhmanov (KAZ)	2

==== 82 kg ====
26 September

1/8 finals
Ulugbek Rakhmonov (UZB)	SUB
Törtogtokhyn Otgonzayaa (MGL)
Zhamalbek Asylbek Uulu (KGZ)	9
Sufyan Nadhim (IRQ)	0
Ruslan Zharkynbayev (KAZ)	1
Zafar Olimshoev (TJK)	3
Mohamad Kasem (SYR)	1
Nurberdihan Orazmämmedow (TKM)	6
Hussein Al-Jarrah (YEM)	0
Pavel Goncharov (KGZ)	9

Quarterfinals
Ulugbek Rakhmonov (UZB)	3
Zhamalbek Asylbek Uulu (KGZ)	3
Parahat Bäşimow (TKM)	3
Yerkebulan Kalesh (KAZ)	5
Sadiqullah Nemat (AFG)
Zafar Olimshoev (TJK)	SUB
Nurberdihan Orazmämmedow (TKM)
Pavel Goncharov (KGZ)	SUB

Semifinals
Zhamalbek Asylbek Uulu (KGZ)	2
Yerkebulan Kalesh (KAZ)	0
Zafar Olimshoev (TJK)	6
Pavel Goncharov (KGZ)	1

Final
Zhamalbek Asylbek Uulu (KGZ)	8
Zafar Olimshoev (TJK)	0

Repechage round 1
Sufyan Nadhim (IRQ)	0
Ulugbek Rakhmonov (UZB)	10
Ruslan Zharkynbayev (KAZ)	WO
Sadiqullah Nemat (AFG)
Hussein Al-Jarrah (YEM)
Nurberdihan Orazmämmedow (TKM)	SUB

Repechage round 2
Ulugbek Rakhmonov (UZB)	TT
Parahat Bäşimow (TKM)
Ruslan Zharkynbayev (KAZ)	1
Nurberdihan Orazmämmedow (TKM)	2

Repechage bronze
Ulugbek Rakhmonov (UZB)	8
Pavel Goncharov (KGZ)	0
Nurberdihan Orazmämmedow (TKM)	1
Yerkebulan Kalesh (KAZ)	0

- Zhamalbek Asylbek Uulu of Kyrgyzstan originally won the gold medal, but was disqualified after he tested positive for Meldonium.

==== 90 kg ====
24 September

First round
Ruslan Esgerow (TKM)	6
Pongsakon Chotiyaphat (THA)	0
Iraj Amirkhani (IRI)	9
Renzo Miguel Cazeñas (PHI)	0
Umed Khasanbekov (TJK)	8
Narmyrat Taňryberdiýew (TKM)	0

Quarter-finals
Ruslan Esgerow (TKM)	7
Turarbek Zholdoshkaziev (KGZ)	2
Iraj Amirkhani (IRI)	10
Mahmoodullhaq Mohammadi (AFG)	0
Umed Khasanbekov (TJK)	4
Pierre Bou Abboud (LBN)	0
Lalit Narain (IND)	0
Nemat Yokubov (UZB)	8

Semi-finals
Ruslan Esgerow (TKM)	8
Iraj Amirkhani (IRI)	0
Umed Khasanbekov (TJK)	1
Nemat Yokubov (UZB)	2

Final
Ruslan Esgerow (TKM)	5
Nemat Yokubov (UZB)	7

Repechage round 1
Pongsakon Chotiyaphat (THA)
Turarbek Zholdoshkaziev (KGZ)	SUB
Renzo Miguel Cazeñas (PHI)
Mahmoodullhaq Mohammadi (AFG)	WO
Narmyrat Taňryberdiýew (TKM)	6
Pierre Bou Abboud (LBN)	0

Repechage round 2
Turarbek Zholdoshkaziev (KGZ)	8
Mahmoodullhaq Mohammadi (AFG)	0
Narmyrat Taňryberdiýew (TKM)	8
Lalit Narain (IND)	0

Repechage bronze
Turarbek Zholdoshkaziev (KGZ)	1
Umed Khasanbekov (TJK)	4
Narmyrat Taňryberdiýew (TKM)	2
Iraj Amirkhani (IRI)	7

=== Men's combat ===
==== 52 kg ====
26 September

1/8 finals
Tolmas Tukliev (UZB)	3
Nurken Dombayev (KAZ)	3

Quarterfinals
Tolmas Tukliev (UZB)	0
Nowruz Ataýew (TKM)	8
Robin Catalan (PHI)	12
Chatchai Ritthidecha (THA)	4
Mukhametali Ergeshev (KGZ)	0
Ýeňiş Merdanow (TKM)	8
Mohammad Ibrahim Maskeen (AFG)
Bye

Semifinals
Nowruz Ataýew (TKM)	8
Robin Catalan (PHI)	0
Ýeňiş Merdanow (TKM)	WD
Mohammad Ibrahim Maskeen (AFG)

Final
Nowruz Ataýew (TKM)	1
Ýeňiş Merdanow (TKM)	1

Repechage round 2
Tolmas Tukliev (UZB)	9
Chatchai Ritthidecha (THA)	0
Mukhametali Ergeshev (KGZ)
Bye

Repechage bronze
Tolmas Tukliev (UZB)	8
Mohammad Ibrahim Maskeen (AFG)	0
Mukhametali Ergeshev (KGZ)	13
Robin Catalan (PHI)	3

==== 57 kg ====
24 September

1/8 finals
Gantömöriin Bayanduuren (MGL)	1
Batyr Durdyýew (TKM)	1
Ahmet Taňryberdiýew (TKM)	WD
Ilimbek Zhanybekov (KGZ)

Quarterfinals
Batyr Durdyýew (TKM)	10
Puriwat Supapitakpong (THA)	0
Rakhmatjon Akhmedov (UZB)	9
Nauryzbek Dauletbayev (KAZ)	0
Ahmet Taňryberdiýew (TKM)	6
Lutfilla Saydamatov (UZB)	1
Munir Ghusn (SYR)	0
Mohammad Kordabadi (IRI)	8

Semifinals
Batyr Durdyýew (TKM)	0
Rakhmatjon Akhmedov (UZB)	8
Ahmet Taňryberdiýew (TKM)	8
Mohammad Kordabadi (IRI)	0

Final
Rakhmatjon Akhmedov (UZB)	0
Ahmet Taňryberdiýew (TKM)	8

Repechage round 1
Gantömöriin Bayanduuren (MGL)	SUB
Puriwat Supapitakpong (THA)
Ilimbek Zhanybekov (KGZ)	0
Lutfilla Saydamatov (UZB)	2

Repechage round 2
Gantömöriin Bayanduuren (MGL)	TT
Nauryzbek Dauletbayev (KAZ)
Lutfilla Saydamatov (UZB)	8
Munir Ghusn (SYR)	0

Repechage bronze
Gantömöriin Bayanduuren (MGL)	SUB
Mohammad Kordabadi (IRI)
Lutfilla Saydamatov (UZB)	7
Batyr Durdyýew (TKM)	0

==== 62 kg ====
25 September

1/8 finals
Kerimberdi Döwletow (TKM)	9
Pongthep Tumrongluk (THA)	0
Amandyk Assauuly (KAZ)	8
Davaadorjiin Odgerel (MGL)	0
Ruslan Ýusupow (TKM)	1
Kazbek Supygaliyev (KAZ)	1

Quarterfinals
Kerimberdi Döwletow (TKM)	9
Sohrab Mubariz (AFG)	0
Amandyk Assauuly (KAZ)	7
Zhoodarbek Satikeev (KGZ)	4
Kazbek Supygaliyev (KAZ)	3
Ulugbek Khakimov (UZB)	4
Alireza Cheraghi (IRI)	1
Orozbek Abtandil Uulu (KGZ)	8

Semifinals
Kerimberdi Döwletow (TKM)	8
Amandyk Assauuly (KAZ)	0
Ulugbek Khakimov (UZB)
Orozbek Abtandil Uulu (KGZ)	SUB

Final
Kerimberdi Döwletow (TKM)	7
Orozbek Abtandil Uulu (KGZ)	4

Repechage round 1
Pongthep Tumrongluk (THA)	0
Sohrab Mubariz (AFG)	5
Davaadorjiin Odgerel (MGL)	WD
Zhoodarbek Satikeev (KGZ)

Repechage round 2
Sohrab Mubariz (AFG)	2KD
Davaadorjiin Odgerel (MGL)
Kazbek Supygaliyev (KAZ)	4
Alireza Cheraghi (IRI)	0

Repechage bronze
Sohrab Mubariz (AFG)	0
Ulugbek Khakimov (UZB)	8
Kazbek Supygaliyev (KAZ)	1
Amandyk Assauuly (KAZ)	3

==== 68 kg ====
26 September

1/8 finals
Sunoto (INA)	0
Zafar Allabergenov (UZB)	10
Abdylla Babaýew (TKM)	8
Arthit Khuansathan (THA)	0
Bektur Mamatiminov (KGZ)
Neimat Assadov (KAZ)	SUB
Döwletmyrat Çeppeýew (TKM)	SUB
Din Mohammad Jurat (AFG)
Nurgeldy Kiyalbekov (KAZ)	8
Alaibek Umotov (KGZ)	0

Quarterfinals
Zafar Allabergenov (UZB)	5
Abdylla Babaýew (TKM)	3
Neimat Assadov (KAZ)	SUB
Pedram Beikzadeh (IRI)
Reydon Romero (PHI)
Döwletmyrat Çeppeýew (TKM)	SUB
Nurgeldy Kiyalbekov (KAZ)	12
Erdenemönkhiin Adiyaa (MGL)	1

Semifinals
Zafar Allabergenov (UZB)	8
Neimat Assadov (KAZ)	0
Döwletmyrat Çeppeýew (TKM)	0
Nurgeldy Kiyalbekov (KAZ)	9

Final
Zafar Allabergenov (UZB)	10
Nurgeldy Kiyalbekov (KAZ)	2

Repechage round 1
Sunoto (INA)	0
Abdylla Babaýew (TKM)	9
Bektur Mamatiminov (KGZ)	8
Pedram Beikzadeh (IRI)	5
Din Mohammad Jurat (AFG)	9
Reydon Romero (PHI)	0
Alaibek Umotov (KGZ)	SUB
Erdenemönkhiin Adiyaa (MGL)

Repechage round 2
Abdylla Babaýew (TKM)	SUB
Bektur Mamatiminov (KGZ)
Din Mohammad Jurat (AFG)
Alaibek Umotov (KGZ)	SUB

Repechage bronze
Abdylla Babaýew (TKM)	3
Döwletmyrat Çeppeýew (TKM)	0
Alaibek Umotov (KGZ)	5
Neimat Assadov (KAZ)	2

==== 74 kg ====
24 September

1/8 finals
Serdar Jorakulyýew (TKM)	KO
Kaiwit Phuengsook (THA)
Şatlyk Çaryýew (TKM)	KO
Zekrullah Amirzada (AFG)

Quarterfinals
Serdar Jorakulyýew (TKM)	0
Assylbek Smailov (KAZ)	9
Salmoorbek Mamatemin Uulu (KGZ)	5
Istam Kudratov (UZB)	2
Şatlyk Çaryýew (TKM)	3
Mohanad Sham (SYR)	0
Jefri Topan Sinambela (INA)	0
Beknazar Raiymkul Uulu (KGZ)	8

Semifinals
Assylbek Smailov (KAZ)	8
Salmoorbek Mamatemin Uulu (KGZ)	0
Şatlyk Çaryýew (TKM)	0
Beknazar Raiymkul Uulu (KGZ)	2

Final
Assylbek Smailov (KAZ)	6
Beknazar Raiymkul Uulu (KGZ)	13

Repechage round 1
Zekrullah Amirzada (AFG)	1
Mohanad Sham (SYR)	6

Repechage round 2
Serdar Jorakulyýew (TKM)	0
Istam Kudratov (UZB)	6
Mohanad Sham (SYR)	8
Jefri Topan Sinambela (INA)	0

Repechage bronze
Istam Kudratov (UZB)	DQ
Şatlyk Çaryýew (TKM)
Mohanad Sham (SYR)	0
Salmoorbek Mamatemin Uulu (KGZ)	10

==== 82 kg ====
25 September

1/8 finals
Jawlanbek Madaminow (TKM)	1
Bekhzod Nurmatov (UZB)	1
Elgün Soltanow (TKM)	9
Matee Wanmanee (THA)	0

Quarterfinals
Jawlanbek Madaminow (TKM)	SUB
Kamal Alikhah (IRI)
Törtogtokhyn Otgonzayaa (MGL)	0
Edilbek Shakirmamatov (KGZ)	8
Elgün Soltanow (TKM)	2
Temirlan Ikhsangaliyev (KAZ)	5
Faridun Odilov (TJK)
Bye

Semifinals
Jawlanbek Madaminow (TKM)	3
Edilbek Shakirmamatov (KGZ)	1
Temirlan Ikhsangaliyev (KAZ)	3
Faridun Odilov (TJK)	2

Final
Jawlanbek Madaminow (TKM)	3
Temirlan Ikhsangaliyev (KAZ)	1

Repechage round 1
Bekhzod Nurmatov (UZB)	SUB
Kamal Alikhah (IRI)

Repechage round 2
Bekhzod Nurmatov (UZB)	WO
Törtogtokhyn Otgonzayaa (MGL)
Elgün Soltanow (TKM)
Bye

Repechage bronze
Bekhzod Nurmatov (UZB)	2
Faridun Odilov (TJK)	11
Elgün Soltanow (TKM)	9
Edilbek Shakirmamatov (KGZ)	1

==== 90 kg ====
26 September

1/8 finals
Raikhan Madi (KAZ)	8
Sadam Chakari (AFG)	0
Yonus Rahman Rahmani (AFG)	0
Zhanybek Amatov (KGZ)	8
Kuanysh Ayazbayev (KAZ)	7
Arslan Imamow (TKM)	2

Quarterfinals
Serdar Hojamuhammedow (TKM)	10
Melis Zholdoshev (KGZ)	2
Raikhan Madi (KAZ)	SUB
Sanjar Nematov (UZB)
Zhanybek Amatov (KGZ)	2KD
Pongsakon Chotiyaphat (THA)
Kuanysh Ayazbayev (KAZ)
Bye

Semifinals
Serdar Hojamuhammedow (TKM)	4
Raikhan Madi (KAZ)	3
Zhanybek Amatov (KGZ)	7
Kuanysh Ayazbayev (KAZ)	0

Final
Serdar Hojamuhammedow (TKM)
Zhanybek Amatov (KGZ)	WD

Repechage round 1
Sadam Chakari (AFG)	0
Sanjar Nematov (UZB)	8
Yonus Rahman Rahmani (AFG)	DQ
Pongsakon Chotiyaphat (THA)
Arslan Imamow (TKM)
Bye

Repechage round 2
Melis Zholdoshev (KGZ)	0
Sanjar Nematov (UZB)	8
Yonus Rahman Rahmani (AFG)	0
Arslan Imamow (TKM)	9

Repechage bronze
Sanjar Nematov (UZB)	12
Kuanysh Ayazbayev (KAZ)	4
Arslan Imamow (TKM)	0
Raikhan Madi (KAZ)	8

==== 100 kg ====
24 September

Quarterfinals
Saimullah Mahdawi (AFG)
Babajan Iwadullaýew (TKM)	TT
Dalaidorjiin Ariunbat (MGL)
Daniiar Alymzhanov (KGZ)	WD
Aibolat Muratuly (KAZ)
Çarymyrat Annagurbanow (TKM)	TT
Ulukbek Mamytov (KGZ)
Islomjon Azimov (UZB)	TT

Semifinals
Babajan Iwadullaýew (TKM)
Daniiar Alymzhanov (KGZ)	2KD
Çarymyrat Annagurbanow (TKM)	1
Islomjon Azimov (UZB)	0

Final
Daniiar Alymzhanov (KGZ)	0
Çarymyrat Annagurbanow (TKM)	8

Repechage round 1
Saimullah Mahdawi (AFG)	WO
Dalaidorjiin Ariunbat (MGL)
Aibolat Muratuly (KAZ)	0
Ulukbek Mamytov (KGZ)	2

Repechage bronze
Saimullah Mahdawi (AFG)
Islomjon Azimov (UZB)	SUB
Ulukbek Mamytov (KGZ)	DQ
Babajan Iwadullaýew (TKM)

==== +100 kg ====
25 September

Quarterfinals
Milad Shiri (IRI)	KO
Chantawat Prothien (THA)
Zafar Madaminow (TKM)	5
Maksat Musabaev (KGZ)	0
Mansour Sarwari (AFG)
Şöhrat Annamuhammedow (TKM)	WD
Olim Khudaykulov (UZB)	9
Tlek Kuzbakov (KAZ)	0

Semifinals
Milad Shiri (IRI)
Zafar Madaminow (TKM)	DQ
Şöhrat Annamuhammedow (TKM)	0
Olim Khudaykulov (UZB)	8

Final
Zafar Madaminow (TKM)	2KD
Olim Khudaykulov (UZB)

Repechage round 1
Chantawat Prothien (THA)
Maksat Musabaev (KGZ)	KO
Mansour Sarwari (AFG)
Tlek Kuzbakov (KAZ)	WD

Repechage bronze
Maksat Musabaev (KGZ)	8
Şöhrat Annamuhammedow (TKM)	1
Tlek Kuzbakov (KAZ)	0
Milad Shiri (IRI)	9

=== Women ===
==== 48 kg ====
24 September

Quarterfinals		Semifinals		Final
Nodira Gulova (UZB)	1
Aizhan Zhylkybayeva (KAZ)	2	Aizhan Zhylkybayeva (KAZ)	10
Pittayarut Benyamas (THA)	0	Aziza Nazarowa (TKM)	0
Aziza Nazarowa (TKM)	3			Aizhan Zhylkybayeva (KAZ)	1
Zhadyra Paiyz (KAZ)	3			Aitkul Abdyldabek Kyzy (KGZ)	0
Arzuw Ýalkapowa (TKM)	1	Zhadyra Paiyz (KAZ)	0
		Aitkul Abdyldabek Kyzy (KGZ)	6

Repechage bronze
Nodira Gulova (UZB)	5
Aziza Nazarowa (TKM)	0
Bye
Zhadyra Paiyz (KAZ)

==== 52 kg ====
25 September

Quarterfinals
Hurma Abdyýewa (TKM)	0
Gulnur Yerbolova (KAZ)	4

Semifinals
Gulnur Yerbolova (KAZ)	9
Wanida Raksat (THA)	0
Sampilyn Solongogerel (MGL)
Gülbadam Babamuratowa (TKM)	SUB

Final
Gulnur Yerbolova (KAZ)
Gülbadam Babamuratowa (TKM)	SUB

Repechage bronze
Hurma Abdyýewa (TKM)	9
Wanida Raksat (THA)	0
Bye
Sampilyn Solongogerel (MGL)

==== 56 kg ====
26 September

1/8 finals
Sasipilai Chaisang (THA)
Mähri Akmyradowa (TKM)	SUB

Quarterfinals
Mähri Akmyradowa (TKM)	3
Davaadorjiin Bolor-Erdene (MGL)	6
Lea Farhat (LBN)	7
Evie Riana Widya Siwi (INA)	1
Nadia Assaf (SYR)
Lee Chia-yi (TPE)	DQ
Ruşana Nurjawowa (TKM)	5
Malikabonu Mirzaeva (UZB)	1

Semifinals
Davaadorjiin Bolor-Erdene (MGL)	3
Lea Farhat (LBN)	1
Lee Chia-yi (TPE)
Ruşana Nurjawowa (TKM)	SUB

Final
Davaadorjiin Bolor-Erdene (MGL)	1
Ruşana Nurjawowa (TKM)	9

Repechage round 2
Mähri Akmyradowa (TKM)	6
Evie Riana Widya Siwi (INA)	0
Nadia Assaf (SYR)
Malikabonu Mirzaeva (UZB)	SUB

Repechage bronze
Mähri Akmyradowa (TKM)	5
Lee Chia-yi (TPE)	0
Malikabonu Mirzaeva (UZB)	SUB
Lea Farhat (LBN)

==== 60 kg ====
24 September

Quarterfinals
Akkal Otebek (KAZ)	2
Altyn Jepbarowa (TKM)	0
Çynar Çerkezowa (TKM)	0
Azhar Kenbeil (KAZ)	6

Semifinals
Akkal Otebek (KAZ)	1
Gulnoza Ziyaeva (UZB)	0
Azhar Kenbeil (KAZ)	TT
Titapa Junsookplung (THA)

Final
Akkal Otebek (KAZ)	0
Azhar Kenbeil (KAZ)	2

Repechage bronze
Altyn Jepbarowa (TKM)	1
Gulnoza Ziyaeva (UZB)	1
Çynar Çerkezowa (TKM)	1
Titapa Junsookplung (THA)	2

==== 64 kg ====
25 September

Quarterfinals
Aýjemal Gurbanowa (TKM)	0
Irina Kulakova (UZB)	4
Anongnat Thammaphorn (THA)	0
Dinara Zhumabayeva (KAZ)	8
Hasna Saied (SYR)
Zyba Orunowa (TKM)	SUB

Semifinals
Irina Kulakova (UZB)	1
Dinara Zhumabayeva (KAZ)	1
Zyba Orunowa (TKM)	8
Mutiara Amanda (INA)	0

Final
Dinara Zhumabayeva (KAZ)	4
Zyba Orunowa (TKM)	1

Repechage bronze
Anongnat Thammaphorn (THA)	0
Irina Kulakova (UZB)	2
Hasna Saied (SYR)	2
Mutiara Amanda (INA)	3

==== 68 kg ====
26 September

1/8 finals
Gulmira Ismatova (UZB)	9
Ogulgerek Nurmedowa (TKM)	0

Quarterfinals
Gulmira Ismatova (UZB)	4
Sabah Al-Khedr (SYR)	0
Saitan Somching (THA)	0
Dildash Kuryshbayeva (KAZ)	9
Markhabat Kuatbekova (KAZ)	SUB
Mönkh-Erdeniin Bayartuul (MGL)
Sunita Rani (IND)	0
Göwher Nuryýewa (TKM)	4

Semifinals
Gulmira Ismatova (UZB)	0
Dildash Kuryshbayeva (KAZ)	4
Markhabat Kuatbekova (KAZ)	8
Göwher Nuryýewa (TKM)	0

Final
Dildash Kuryshbayeva (KAZ)	8
Markhabat Kuatbekova (KAZ)	0

Repechage round 1
Ogulgerek Nurmedowa (TKM)	1
Sabah Al-Khedr (SYR)	5

Repechage round 2
Sabah Al-Khedr (SYR)	1
Saitan Somching (THA)	2
Mönkh-Erdeniin Bayartuul (MGL)	WO
Sunita Rani (IND)

Repechage bronze
Saitan Somching (THA)	3
Göwher Nuryýewa (TKM)	1
Mönkh-Erdeniin Bayartuul (MGL)	1
Gulmira Ismatova (UZB)	7

==== 72 kg ====
24 September

Quarterfinals
Supattra Nanong (THA)	0
Läle Nuryýewa (TKM)	6
Yang Ya-chun (TPE)	0
Dilafruz Ýusupowa (TKM)	5

Semifinals
Läle Nuryýewa (TKM)	0
Zere Bektaskyzy (KAZ)	8
Dilafruz Ýusupowa (TKM)	0
Tsogt-Ochiryn Battsetseg (MGL)	8

Final
Zere Bektaskyzy (KAZ)	8
Tsogt-Ochiryn Battsetseg (MGL)	0

Repechage bronze
Bye
Läle Nuryýewa (TKM)
Bye
Dilafruz Ýusupowa (TKM)
