= Kurash at the 2017 Asian Indoor and Martial Arts Games =

- Venue: Ashgabat Martial Arts Arena
- Dates: 20–22 September 2017

Kurash at the 2017 Asian Indoor and Martial Arts Games was held in Ashgabat, Turkmenistan from 20 to 22 September 2017 at the Martial Arts Arena.

== Medalists ==
=== Men ===
| Event | Gold | Silver | Bronze |
|---|---|---|---|
| −60 kg | Behzad Vahdani; Iran | Erkin Omurzakow; Turkmenistan | Şöhrat Hallyýew; Turkmenistan |
| −60 kg | Behzad Vahdani; Iran | Erkin Omurzakow; Turkmenistan | Al Llamas; Philippines |
| −66 kg | Marat Orazow; Turkmenistan | Nedir Allaberdiýew; Turkmenistan | Ghanbar Ali Ghanbari; Iran |
| −66 kg | Marat Orazow; Turkmenistan | Nedir Allaberdiýew; Turkmenistan | Khushqadam Khusravov; Tajikistan |
| −73 kg | Davlat Abraev; Uzbekistan | Behruzi Khojazoda; Tajikistan | Omid Tiztak; Iran |
| −73 kg | Davlat Abraev; Uzbekistan | Behruzi Khojazoda; Tajikistan | Motonori Shimada; Japan |
| −81 kg | Kamoliddin Rasulov; Uzbekistan | Huang Chun-ta; Chinese Taipei | Elias Aliakbari; Iran |
| −81 kg | Kamoliddin Rasulov; Uzbekistan | Huang Chun-ta; Chinese Taipei | Muhammet Temirow; Turkmenistan |
| −90 kg | Shukhratjon Arslanov; Uzbekistan | Mojtaba Zamani; Iran | Ali Al-Taweel; Independent Olympic Athletes |
| −90 kg | Shukhratjon Arslanov; Uzbekistan | Mojtaba Zamani; Iran | Shayan Kheirandish; Iran |
| −100 kg | Ilkhom Juraev; Uzbekistan | Mojtaba Nikbin; Iran | Firdavs Nasimov; Tajikistan |
| −100 kg | Ilkhom Juraev; Uzbekistan | Mojtaba Nikbin; Iran | Guwanç Begaliýew; Turkmenistan |
| +100 kg | Mukhsin Khisomiddinov; Uzbekistan | Kamran Rostami; Iran | Mirwais Omarkhil; Afghanistan |
| +100 kg | Mukhsin Khisomiddinov; Uzbekistan | Kamran Rostami; Iran | Begenç Begaliýew; Turkmenistan |

=== Women ===
| Event | Gold | Silver | Bronze |
|---|---|---|---|
| −48 kg | Zarina Saparowa; Turkmenistan | Malaprabha Jadhav; India | Tsou Chia-wen; Chinese Taipei |
| −48 kg | Zarina Saparowa; Turkmenistan | Malaprabha Jadhav; India | Đỗ Thu Hà; Vietnam |
| −52 kg | Gulnor Sulaymanova; Uzbekistan | Saýýara Ereşowa; Turkmenistan | Aýnur Amanowa; Turkmenistan |
| −52 kg | Gulnor Sulaymanova; Uzbekistan | Saýýara Ereşowa; Turkmenistan | Nichakan Seesai; Thailand |
| −57 kg | Dildora Shermetova; Uzbekistan | Prapathip Narkkarach; Thailand | Mähriban Kurbanowa; Turkmenistan |
| −57 kg | Dildora Shermetova; Uzbekistan | Prapathip Narkkarach; Thailand | Lee Wan-ting; Chinese Taipei |
| −63 kg | Cheng Yu-erh; Chinese Taipei | Maral Sultanowa; Turkmenistan | Gülşat Nasyrowa; Turkmenistan |
| −63 kg | Cheng Yu-erh; Chinese Taipei | Maral Sultanowa; Turkmenistan | Hasna Saied; Syria |
| −70 kg | Yang Hsien-tzu; Chinese Taipei | Mariýa Lohowa; Turkmenistan | Nasiba Hallyýewa; Turkmenistan |
| −70 kg | Yang Hsien-tzu; Chinese Taipei | Mariýa Lohowa; Turkmenistan | Gavhar Khudaykulova; Uzbekistan |
| −78 kg | Kumush Yuldashova; Uzbekistan | Kao Chia-jing; Chinese Taipei | Orazgül Seýidowa; Turkmenistan |
| −78 kg | Kumush Yuldashova; Uzbekistan | Kao Chia-jing; Chinese Taipei | Gözel Karimbaýewa; Turkmenistan |
| −87 kg | Rakhima Yuldoshova; Uzbekistan | Şirin Kubaýewa; Turkmenistan | Jyoti; India |
| −87 kg | Rakhima Yuldoshova; Uzbekistan | Şirin Kubaýewa; Turkmenistan | Zahra Bagheri; Iran |
| +87 kg | Trần Thị Thanh Thủy; Vietnam | Anna Dmitriýewa; Turkmenistan | Leýla Aliýewa; Turkmenistan |
| +87 kg | Trần Thị Thanh Thủy; Vietnam | Anna Dmitriýewa; Turkmenistan | Neha Solanki; India |

== Medal table ==
| Rank | Nation | Gold | Silver | Bronze | Total |
|---|---|---|---|---|---|
| 1 | Uzbekistan (UZB) | 9 | 0 | 1 | 10 |
| 2 | Turkmenistan (TKM) | 2 | 7 | 11 | 20 |
| 3 | Chinese Taipei (TPE) | 2 | 2 | 2 | 6 |
| 4 | Iran (IRI) | 1 | 3 | 5 | 9 |
| 5 | Vietnam (VIE) | 1 | 0 | 1 | 2 |
| 6 | India (IND) | 0 | 1 | 2 | 3 |
| 6 | Tajikistan (TJK) | 0 | 1 | 2 | 3 |
| 8 | Thailand (THA) | 0 | 1 | 1 | 2 |
| 9 | Afghanistan (AFG) | 0 | 0 | 1 | 1 |
| 9 | Independent Olympic Athletes (IOA) | 0 | 0 | 1 | 1 |
| 9 | Japan (JPN) | 0 | 0 | 1 | 1 |
| 9 | Philippines (PHI) | 0 | 0 | 1 | 1 |
| 9 | Syria (SYR) | 0 | 0 | 1 | 1 |
| Totals (13 entries) | | 15 | 15 | 30 | 60 |

== Results ==
=== Men ===
==== 60 kg ====
20 September

1/8 finals
Şöhrat Hallyýew (TKM) | 102
Wanlop Phuengsampao (THA) | 000
Munir Ghusn (SYR) | 101
Ajay Kumar (IND) | 001
Hamid Tallan (YEM) | 101
Saksiri Khemawantaphong (THA) | 001
Al Llamas (PHI) | 013
Mochammad Latif (INA) | 011
Joe Haddad (LBN) | WO
Ravi Kumar (IND)

1/4 finals
Iskandar Khakimjonov (UZB) | 000
Şöhrat Hallyýew (TKM) | 100
Behzad Vahdani (IRI) | 101
Munir Ghusn (SYR) | 000
Hamid Tallan (YEM) | 001
Al Llamas (PHI) | 012
Joe Haddad (LBN) | 000
Erkin Omurzakow (TKM) | 100

Semifinals
Şöhrat Hallyýew (TKM) | 001
Behzad Vahdani (IRI) | 011
Al Llamas (PHI) | 000
Erkin Omurzakow (TKM) | 101

Final
Behzad Vahdani (IRI) | 013
Erkin Omurzakow (TKM) | 001

==== 66 kg ====
21 September

1/8 finals
Jacky Gahlot (IND) | 010
Jatin (IND) | 001
Bakhodur Khalimov (TJK) | 000
Ghanbar Ali Ghanbari (IRI) | 010
Nedir Allaberdiýew (TKM) | 100
Kanokphon Somboon (THA) | 000
Nguyễn Hải Ba (VIE) | 000
Khushqadam Khusravov (TJK) | 003
Ali Hadi (IRQ) | 101
Aprilianda Adi Timur (INA) | 000
Shuaib Yuosuf (AFG) | 100
Jaroenmitr Sanaotoy (THA) | 001
Ghady Moussa (LBN) | 000
Marat Orazow (TKM) | 101

1/4 finals
Jacky Gahlot (IND) | 000
Ghanbar Ali Ghanbari (IRI) | 004
Nedir Allaberdiýew (TKM) | 011
Shakhram Ahadov (UZB) | 002
Khushqadam Khusravov (TJK) | 012
Ali Hadi (IRQ) | 000
Shuaib Yuosuf (AFG) | 000
Marat Orazow (TKM) | 100

Semifinals
Ghanbar Ali Ghanbari (IRI) | 000
Nedir Allaberdiýew (TKM) | 003
Khushqadam Khusravov (TJK) | 000
Marat Orazow (TKM) | 101

Final
Nedir Allaberdiýew (TKM) | 001
Marat Orazow (TKM) | 010

==== 73 kg ====
21 September

1/16 finals
| Ihsan Falah (IRQ) | 000–100 | Omid Tiztak (IRI) |

1/8 finals
Nurýagdy Jepbarow (TKM) | 001
Davlat Abraev (UZB) | 003
Dennis Catipon (PHI) | 002
Elias Haddad (LBN) | 001
Boryn Altangerel (MGL) | 000
Mansoorbig Bigzada (AFG) | 101
Bhanu Partap (IND) | 000
Omid Tiztak (IRI) | 102
Nazar Kerimow (TKM) | 001
Behruzi Khojazoda (TJK) | 013
Mohanad Sham (SYR) | 102
Mahmood Yaseen (IRQ) | 000
Nopphasit Lertsirisombut (THA) | 000
Ahmed Ayash (YEM) | 111
Ashutosh Girish Lokare (IND) | 000
Motonori Shimada (JPN) | 101

1/4 finals
Davlat Abraev (UZB) | 101
Dennis Catipon (PHI) | 000
Mansoorbig Bigzada (AFG) | 000
Omid Tiztak (IRI) | 110
Behruzi Khojazoda (TJK) | 101
Mohanad Sham (SYR) | 000
Ahmed Ayash (YEM) | 001
Motonori Shimada (JPN) | 010

Semifinals
Davlat Abraev (UZB) | 101
Omid Tiztak (IRI) | 000
Behruzi Khojazoda (TJK) | 111
Motonori Shimada (JPN) | 000

Final
Davlat Abraev (UZB) | 011
Behruzi Khojazoda (TJK) | 001

==== 81 kg ====
21 September

1/8 finals
Serdar Jummyýew (TKM) | 000
Mohammad Arif Malikyar (AFG) | 001
Bùi Minh Quân (VIE) | 001
Elias Aliakbari (IRI) | 101
Pharuehatphasathonbodee Suwannaphueng (THA) | 000
Huang Chun-ta (TPE) | 100
Abhishek Rana (IND) | 000
Mohamad Kasem (SYR) | 101
Muhammet Temirow (TKM) | 111
Gaurav Tokas (IND) | 000
Bagas Jaya Hartanto (INA) | WO
Akmal Murodov (TJK)
Sufyan Nadhim (IRQ) | 001
Hussein Al-Jarrah (YEM) | 011

1/4 finals
Mohammad Arif Malikyar (AFG) | 001
Elias Aliakbari (IRI) | 101
Huang Chun-ta (TPE) | 111
Mohamad Kasem (SYR) | 001
Muhammet Temirow (TKM) | 100
Bagas Jaya Hartanto (INA) | 000
Hussein Al-Jarrah (YEM) | 000
Kamoliddin Rasulov (UZB) | 112

Semifinals
Elias Aliakbari (IRI) | 010
Huang Chun-ta (TPE) | 010
Muhammet Temirow (TKM) | 000
Kamoliddin Rasulov (UZB) | 012

Final
Huang Chun-ta (TPE) | 000
Kamoliddin Rasulov (UZB) | 010

==== 90 kg ====
22 September

1/8 finals
Dipak Chhantyal (NEP)
Pierre Bou Abboud (LBN) | WO
Ali Al-Taweel (IOA) | 106
Sakon Saejueng (THA) | 000
Mojtaba Zamani (IRI) | 101
Azizjan Hojakuliýew (TKM) | 000
Akshay Tomar (IND) | 000
Ajmal Ishaqzai (AFG) | 100
Sanjar Abdyrahmanow (TKM) | 102
Mohanad Hasan (IRQ) | 000
Jayson Senales (PHI) | 100
Yogesh Kanahayalal Untwal (IND) | 000
Abdullah Al-Najdi (IOA)
Shayan Kheirandish (IRI) | WO

1/4 finals
Pierre Bou Abboud (LBN) | 000
Ali Al-Taweel (IOA) | 101
Mojtaba Zamani (IRI) | 011
Ajmal Ishaqzai (AFG) | 000
Sanjar Abdyrahmanow (TKM) | 002
Shukhratjon Arslanov (UZB) | 010
Jayson Senales (PHI) | 000
Shayan Kheirandish (IRI) | 101

Semifinals
Ali Al-Taweel (IOA) | 001
Mojtaba Zamani (IRI) | 112
Shukhratjon Arslanov (UZB) | 002
Shayan Kheirandish (IRI) | 000

Final
Mojtaba Zamani (IRI) | 012
Shukhratjon Arslanov (UZB) | 101

==== 100 kg ====
22 September

1/8 finals
Manish Kumar (IND) | 000
Rabih Bader (LBN) | 100
Vishal Sharma (IND)
Mojtaba Nikbin (IRI) | WO
Jad Fadel (LBN)
Takashi Tanaka (JPN) | WO

1/4 finals
Batyr Hojamuhammedow (TKM) | 001
Ilkhom Juraev (UZB) | 010
Firdavs Nasimov (TJK) | 100
Rabih Bader (LBN) | 000
Mojtaba Nikbin (IRI) | WO
Saidzhalol Saidov (TJK)
Guwanç Begaliýew (TKM) | 101
Takashi Tanaka (JPN) | 000

Semifinals
Ilkhom Juraev (UZB) | 001
Firdavs Nasimov (TJK) | 000
Mojtaba Nikbin (IRI) | 001
Guwanç Begaliýew (TKM) | 000

Final
Ilkhom Juraev (UZB) | 001
Mojtaba Nikbin (IRI) | 000

==== +100 kg ====
22 September

1/8 finals
Mirwais Omarkhil (AFG) | 100
Chiranshu Jain (IND) | 000
Dither Tablan (PHI) | 000
Kunathip Yea-on (THA) | 100
Yahya Mohammed (IRQ) | 101
Suraj Pareshkumar Barot (IND) | 000

1/4 finals
Mukhamadmurod Abdurakhmonov (TJK)
Kamran Rostami (IRI) | WO
Şöhrat Taşew (TKM) | 000
Mirwais Omarkhil (AFG) | 101
Kunathip Yea-on (THA) | 000
Mukhsin Khisomiddinov (UZB) | 100
Begenç Begaliýew (TKM) | 010
Yahya Mohammed (IRQ) | 000

Semifinals
Kamran Rostami (IRI) | 100
Mirwais Omarkhil (AFG) | 000
Mukhsin Khisomiddinov (UZB) | 110
Begenç Begaliýew (TKM) | 000

Final
Kamran Rostami (IRI) | 001
Mukhsin Khisomiddinov (UZB) | 011

=== Women ===
==== 48 kg ====
22 September

1/8 finals
Anggun Nurajijah (INA) | 002
Parichat Wannapakdee (THA) | 000
Monica Pineda (PHI) | 001
Malaprabha Jadhav (IND) | 001
Sudawan Taotong (THA) | 001
Mahima Tokas (IND) | 010

1/4 finals
Tsou Chia-wen (TPE) | 001
Anggun Nurajijah (INA) | 001
Oguljan Hallyýewa (TKM) | 000
Malaprabha Jadhav (IND) | 100
Đỗ Thu Hà (VIE) | 001
Mokhinur Muminova (UZB) | 000
Mahima Tokas (IND) | 000
Zarina Saparowa (TKM) | 100

Semifinals
Tsou Chia-wen (TPE) | 002
Malaprabha Jadhav (IND) | 010
Đỗ Thu Hà (VIE) | 001
Zarina Saparowa (TKM) | 002

Final
Malaprabha Jadhav (IND) | 001
Zarina Saparowa (TKM) | 010

==== 52 kg ====
22 September

1/8 finals
Besto Rani Devi (IND) | 000
Phichamon Tiawcharoen (THA) | 002
Helen Dawa (PHI) | 100
Dolly Sharma (IND) | 000

1/4 finals
Gulnor Sulaymanova (UZB) | 010
Maria Magdalena Ince (INA) | 000
Aýnur Amanowa (TKM) | 102
Phichamon Tiawcharoen (THA) | 000
Tô Thị Trang (VIE) | 000
Nichakan Seesai (THA) | 100
Saýýara Ereşowa (TKM) | 011
Helen Dawa (PHI) | 001

Semifinals
Gulnor Sulaymanova (UZB) | 100
Aýnur Amanowa (TKM) | 000
Nichakan Seesai (THA) | 000
Saýýara Ereşowa (TKM) | 013

Final
Gulnor Sulaymanova (UZB) | 100
Saýýara Ereşowa (TKM) | 000

==== 57 kg ====
22 September

1/8 finals
Jenielou Mosqueda (PHI) | 011
Lê Thị Tình (VIE) | 001
Komal Hanmant Halgekar (IND) | 101
Nadia Assaf (SYR) | 000
Prapathip Narkkarach (THA) | 002
Ochirpüreviin Lkhagvakhüü (MGL) | 001
Saloni Yadav (IND) | 000
Lea Farhat (LBN) | 101
Dildora Shermetova (UZB) | 100
Heka Maya Sari Sembiring (INA) | 000

1/4 finals
Mähriban Kurbanowa (TKM) | 100
Jenielou Mosqueda (PHI) | 000
Komal Hanmant Halgekar (IND) | 000
Prapathip Narkkarach (THA) | 101
Lea Farhat (LBN) | 000
Lee Wan-ting (TPE) | 012
Dildora Shermetova (UZB) | 001
Aýna Jumakulyýewa (TKM) | 000

Semifinals
Mähriban Kurbanowa (TKM) | 001
Prapathip Narkkarach (THA) | 001
Lee Wan-ting (TPE) | 000
Dildora Shermetova (UZB) | 012

Final
Prapathip Narkkarach (THA) | 000
Dildora Shermetova (UZB) | 100

==== 63 kg ====
21 September

1/8 finals
Freshta Afshar (AFG) | 001
Chandra Ariati (INA) | 100
Zahra Naderi (IRI) | 001
Nguyễn Thị Hương (VIE) | 011
Gitanjali Pawar (IND) | 011
Hasna Saied (SYR) | 012

1/4 finals
Gülşat Nasyrowa (TKM) | 014
Chandra Ariati (INA) | 000
Cheng Yu-erh (TPE) | 100
Nguyễn Thị Hương (VIE) | 000
Sunaree Janjek (THA) | 000
Maral Sultanowa (TKM) | 100
Hasna Saied (SYR) | 010
Mokhinur Pirnazarova (UZB) | 002

Semifinals
Gülşat Nasyrowa (TKM) | 000
Cheng Yu-erh (TPE) | 101
Maral Sultanowa (TKM) | 100
Hasna Saied (SYR) | 000

Final
Cheng Yu-erh (TPE) | 001
Maral Sultanowa (TKM) | 001

==== 70 kg ====
21 September

1/8 finals
Jyoti Tokas (IND) | 000
Sabah Al-Khedr (SYR) | 013
Gavhar Khudaykulova (UZB) | 011
Raheleh Asghari (IRI) | 000
Bianca Estrella (PHI) | 001
Nguyễn Thị Lan (VIE) | 013

1/4 finals
Mahboubeh Bidel (IRI) | 000
Yang Hsien-tzu (TPE) | 101
Nasiba Hallyýewa (TKM) | 110
Sabah Al-Khedr (SYR) | 000
Tsogt-Ochiryn Battsetseg (MGL) | 001
Gavhar Khudaykulova (UZB) | 111
Nguyễn Thị Lan (VIE) | 001
Mariýa Lohowa (TKM) | 100

Semifinals
Yang Hsien-tzu (TPE) | 101
Nasiba Hallyýewa (TKM) | 000
Gavhar Khudaykulova (UZB) | 000
Mariýa Lohowa (TKM) | 102

Final
Yang Hsien-tzu (TPE) | 002
Mariýa Lohowa (TKM) | 001

==== 78 kg ====
21 September

1/4 finals
Kumush Yuldashova (UZB) | 100
Sapna Shivkumar Naykar (IND) | 000
Meena (IND) | 001
Gözel Karimbaýewa (TKM) | 100
Jayanti Shrestha (NEP) | 000
Kao Chia-jing (TPE) | 100

Semifinals
Kumush Yuldashova (UZB) | 101
Orazgül Seýidowa (TKM) | 000
Gözel Karimbaýewa (TKM) | 001
Kao Chia-jing (TPE) | 001

Final
Kumush Yuldashova (UZB) | 101
Kao Chia-jing (TPE) | 000

==== 87 kg ====
20 September

| 1/4 finals | | Semifinals | | Final |
| Asmila Chhantyal (NEP) | 000 |
| Rakhima Yuldoshova (UZB) | 112 | Rakhima Yuldoshova (UZB) | 006 |
| Ýulduz Adizowa (TKM) | 010 | Jyoti (IND) | 000 |
| Jyoti (IND) | 101 | | | Rakhima Yuldoshova (UZB) | 101 |
| Zahra Bagheri (IRI) | 001 | | | Şirin Kubaýewa (TKM) | 000 |
| Đỗ Thị Hoài Uyên (VIE) | 000 | Zahra Bagheri (IRI) | 000 |
| | | Şirin Kubaýewa (TKM) | 100 |

==== +87 kg ====
20 September

1/4 finals
Rinata Ilmatova (UZB) | 000
Trần Thị Thanh Thủy (VIE) | 002
Yasha Satija (IND) | 001
Leýla Aliýewa (TKM) | 100
Neha Solanki (IND) | WO
Ganboldyn Sarangoo (MGL)

Semifinals
Trần Thị Thanh Thủy (VIE) | 100
Leýla Aliýewa (TKM) | 000
Anna Dmitriýewa (TKM) | 111
Neha Solanki (IND) | 000

Final
Trần Thị Thanh Thủy (VIE) | 011
Anna Dmitriýewa (TKM) | 001
