= Independent Olympic Athletes at the 2017 Asian Indoor and Martial Arts Games =

- IOC code: IOA

in Ashgabat 17–27 September
- Competitors: 2 in 1 sport
- Medals: Gold 0 Silver 0 Bronze 1 Total 1

Asian Indoor and Martial Arts Games appearances
- 2013; 2017; 2021; 2025

Kuwait as Independent Olympic Athletes (IOA) competed under the IOA flag at the 2017 Asian Indoor and Martial Arts Games which was held in Ashgabat, Turkmenistan from September 17 to 27. Only 2 competitors represented the IOA team during the event.

The Independent Olympic Athletes team won 1 bronze medal in the Kurash.

== Participants ==
Sport	Men	Women	Total
Kurash	2	0	2

== Medallists ==
Medal	Name	Sport	Event
Bronze	Ali Al-Taweel	Kurash	Men's 90 kg

== Kurash ==
Independent Olympic Athletes participated in kurash.

Men

Athlete	Event	1/8 Finals	Quarterfinals	Semifinals	Final	
Athlete	Event	Opposition Result	Opposition Result	Opposition Result	Opposition Result	Rank
Ali Al-Taweel	-90 kg	Saejueng (THA); W 106-000	Bou-Abboud (LBN); W 000-101	Zamani (IRI); L 001-112	Did not advance	3rd place, bronze medalist(s)
Abdullah Al-Nadji	-90 kg	Kheirandish (IRI); L WO	Did not advance			
