= Ju-jitsu at the 2017 Asian Indoor and Martial Arts Games =

Asian event

- Venue: Ashgabat Martial Arts Arena
- Dates: 16–19 September 2017

Ju-jitsu competition at the 2017 Asian Indoor and Martial Arts Games was held in Ashgabat, Turkmenistan from 16 to 19 September 2017 at the Martial Arts Arena.

== Medalists ==
=== Duo ===
Event	Gold	Silver	Bronze
Men's classic	Turkmenistan; Jelilmuhammet Hojamyradow; Myrat Gimmiýew	Pakistan; Abu Hurraira Dhanani; Muhammad Ammar	Thailand; Jirayut Wuttiwannaphong; Jirayu Vongsawan
Men's classic	Turkmenistan; Jelilmuhammet Hojamyradow; Myrat Gimmiýew	Pakistan; Abu Hurraira Dhanani; Muhammad Ammar	Tajikistan; Firdavs Sharipov; Firdavs Abdubanopov
Men's show	Pakistan; Rafique Siddique; Shahzeb Nawaz Janjua	Thailand; Thammanun Pothaisong; Warut Netpong	Turkmenistan; Ahmet Taňryberdiýew; Ýusup Taňryberdiýew
Men's show	Pakistan; Rafique Siddique; Shahzeb Nawaz Janjua	Thailand; Thammanun Pothaisong; Warut Netpong	Indonesia; Irvan Ramadhan; Very Maradona Sinaga
Women's classic	Thailand; Kunsatri Kumsroi; Suphawadee Kaeosrasaen	Turkmenistan; Patma Hojiýewa; Jahan Durdyýewa	Vietnam; Đào Lê Thu Trang; Đào Thị Như Quỳnh
Women's classic	Thailand; Kunsatri Kumsroi; Suphawadee Kaeosrasaen	Turkmenistan; Patma Hojiýewa; Jahan Durdyýewa	Pakistan; Komal Emmanuel; Sonia Manzoor
Women's show	Thailand; Kunsatri Kumsroi; Suphawadee Kaeosrasaen	Turkmenistan; Patma Hojiýewa; Jahan Durdyýewa	Vietnam; Đào Thị Như Quỳnh; Đào Lê Thu Trang
Women's show	Thailand; Kunsatri Kumsroi; Suphawadee Kaeosrasaen	Turkmenistan; Patma Hojiýewa; Jahan Durdyýewa	Pakistan; Komal Emmanuel; Sonia Manzoor
Mixed classic	Turkmenistan; Mekan Nurjikow; Jahan Durdyýewa	Thailand; Ratcharat Yimprai; Kunsatri Kumsroi	Pakistan; Shahzeb Nawaz Janjua; Sonia Manzoor
Mixed classic	Turkmenistan; Mekan Nurjikow; Jahan Durdyýewa	Thailand; Ratcharat Yimprai; Kunsatri Kumsroi	Tajikistan; Firdavs Abdubanopov; Nigora Yusupova
Mixed show	Turkmenistan; Myrat Gimmiýew; Patma Hojiýewa	Pakistan; Rafique Siddique; Komal Emmanuel	Thailand; Thammanun Pothaisong; Suphawadee Kaeosrasaen
Mixed show	Turkmenistan; Myrat Gimmiýew; Patma Hojiýewa	Pakistan; Rafique Siddique; Komal Emmanuel	Lebanon; Ghady Moussa; Lea Farhat

=== Men's contact ===
Event	Gold	Silver	Bronze
−62 kg	Hussain Bakhsh Safari; Afghanistan	Dawut Nuryýew; Turkmenistan	Ariet Bekishov; Kyrgyzstan
−62 kg	Hussain Bakhsh Safari; Afghanistan	Dawut Nuryýew; Turkmenistan	Đào Hồng Sơn; Vietnam
−69 kg	Fahraddin Abdullaýew; Turkmenistan	Annageldi Annasähedow; Turkmenistan	Banpot Lertthaisong; Thailand
−69 kg	Fahraddin Abdullaýew; Turkmenistan	Annageldi Annasähedow; Turkmenistan	Zhanbolat Zakarin; Kazakhstan
−77 kg	Begençmyrat Kakabaýew; Turkmenistan	Rustam Rozmetow; Turkmenistan	Sukhrob Usmanov; Uzbekistan
−77 kg	Begençmyrat Kakabaýew; Turkmenistan	Rustam Rozmetow; Turkmenistan	Nurlan Yespolov; Kazakhstan
−85 kg	Rüstem Penjiýew; Turkmenistan	Wýaçeslaw Işhanýan; Turkmenistan	Kuandyk Yesseneyev; Kazakhstan
−85 kg	Rüstem Penjiýew; Turkmenistan	Wýaçeslaw Işhanýan; Turkmenistan	Törtogtokhyn Otgonzayaa; Mongolia

=== Men's ne-waza ===
Event	Gold	Silver	Bronze
−56 kg	Omar Al-Fadhli; United Arab Emirates	Gian Dee; Philippines	Obaid Al-Nuaimi; United Arab Emirates
−56 kg	Omar Al-Fadhli; United Arab Emirates	Gian Dee; Philippines	Jahanzeb Rashad Lone; Pakistan
−62 kg	Amir Yahya; Iraq	Zayed Al-Mansoori; United Arab Emirates	Ölziitogtokhyn Erdenebaatar; Mongolia
−62 kg	Amir Yahya; Iraq	Zayed Al-Mansoori; United Arab Emirates	Said Al-Mazrouei; United Arab Emirates
−69 kg	Talib Al-Kirbi; United Arab Emirates	Marc Lim; Philippines	Ali Ahmed; Iraq
−69 kg	Talib Al-Kirbi; United Arab Emirates	Marc Lim; Philippines	Banpot Lertthaisong; Thailand
−77 kg	Ali Munfaredi; Bahrain	Hamzeh Al-Rasheed; Jordan	Saoud Al-Hammadi; United Arab Emirates
−77 kg	Ali Munfaredi; Bahrain	Hamzeh Al-Rasheed; Jordan	None awarded
−85 kg	Abdurahmanhaji Murtazaliev; Kyrgyzstan	Khalfan Balhol; United Arab Emirates	Mergen Joraýew; Turkmenistan
−85 kg	Abdurahmanhaji Murtazaliev; Kyrgyzstan	Khalfan Balhol; United Arab Emirates	Haidar Al-Rasheed; Jordan
−94 kg	Faisal Al-Ketbi; United Arab Emirates	Zayed Al-Kaabi; United Arab Emirates	Zaid Granduke; Jordan
−94 kg	Faisal Al-Ketbi; United Arab Emirates	Zayed Al-Kaabi; United Arab Emirates	Jonibek Atajanow; Turkmenistan
+94 kg	Masoud Jalilvand; Iran	Masoud Hassanzadeh; Iran	Ravshankhon Khusanov; Uzbekistan
+94 kg	Masoud Jalilvand; Iran	Masoud Hassanzadeh; Iran	Yahya Al-Hammadi; United Arab Emirates
Openweight	Faisal Al-Ketbi; United Arab Emirates	Masoud Hassanzadeh; Iran	Yahya Al-Hammadi; United Arab Emirates
Openweight	Faisal Al-Ketbi; United Arab Emirates	Masoud Hassanzadeh; Iran	Masoud Jalilvand; Iran

=== Women's ne-waza ===
Event	Gold	Silver	Bronze
−45 kg	Meggie Ochoa; Philippines	Đào Lê Thu Trang; Vietnam	Dinara Jumadurdyýewa; Turkmenistan
−45 kg	Meggie Ochoa; Philippines	Đào Lê Thu Trang; Vietnam	Reem Abdulkareem; United Arab Emirates
−49 kg	Suwanan Boonsorn; Thailand	Mouza Al-Shamsi; United Arab Emirates	Ulýana Nazarowa; Turkmenistan
−49 kg	Suwanan Boonsorn; Thailand	Mouza Al-Shamsi; United Arab Emirates	Dương Thị Thanh Minh; Vietnam
−55 kg	Annie Ramirez; Philippines	Kaila Napolis; Philippines	Siramol Deepudsa; Thailand
−55 kg	Annie Ramirez; Philippines	Kaila Napolis; Philippines	Galina Duvanova; Kazakhstan
−62 kg	Orapa Senatham; Thailand	Battsogtyn Buyandelger; Mongolia	Bashayer Al-Matrooshi; United Arab Emirates
−62 kg	Orapa Senatham; Thailand	Battsogtyn Buyandelger; Mongolia	Ruba Al-Sayegh; Jordan
−70 kg	Rana Qubbaj; Jordan	Tsogt-Ochiryn Battsetseg; Mongolia	Nina Kim; Kazakhstan
−70 kg	Rana Qubbaj; Jordan	Tsogt-Ochiryn Battsetseg; Mongolia	Onanong Sangsirichok; Thailand
+70 kg	Aýsoltan Garçowowa; Turkmenistan	Sabina Agajanowa; Turkmenistan	Myagmaryn Sugar; Mongolia
+70 kg	Aýsoltan Garçowowa; Turkmenistan	Sabina Agajanowa; Turkmenistan	Soudeh Kamandani; Iran
Openweight	Tsogt-Ochiryn Battsetseg; Mongolia	Myagmaryn Sugar; Mongolia	Rana Qubbaj; Jordan
Openweight	Tsogt-Ochiryn Battsetseg; Mongolia	Myagmaryn Sugar; Mongolia	Ruba Al-Sayegh; Jordan

== Medal table ==
Rank	Nation	Gold	Silver	Bronze	Total
1	Turkmenistan (TKM)	7	7	5	19
2	United Arab Emirates (UAE)	4	4	7	15
3	Thailand (THA)	4	2	6	12
4	Philippines (PHI)	2	3	0	5
5	Mongolia (MGL)	1	3	3	7
6	Pakistan (PAK)	1	2	4	7
7	Iran (IRI)	1	2	2	5
8	Jordan (JOR)	1	1	5	7
9	Iraq (IRQ)	1	0	1	2
9	Kyrgyzstan (KGZ)	1	0	1	2
11	Afghanistan (AFG)	1	0	0	1
11	Bahrain (BRN)	1	0	0	1
13	Vietnam (VIE)	0	1	4	5
14	Kazakhstan (KAZ)	0	0	5	5
15	Tajikistan (TJK)	0	0	2	2
15	Uzbekistan (UZB)	0	0	2	2
17	Indonesia (INA)	0	0	1	1
17	Lebanon (LBN)	0	0	1	1
Totals (18 entries)		25	25	49	99

== Results ==
=== Duo ===
==== Men's classic ====
16 September

Pos	Team	Pld	W	L	TKM	PAK	THA	TJK
1	Jelilmuhammet Hojamyradow (TKM) Myrat Gimmiýew (TKM)	3	2	1	—	80.0–81.0	78.0–75.5	77.5–63.5
2	Abu Hurraira Dhanani (PAK) Muhammad Ammar (PAK)	3	2	1	81.0–80.0	—	100.5–101.0	78.5–64.0
3	Jirayut Wuttiwannaphong (THA) Jirayu Vongsawan (THA)	3	2	1	75.5–78.0	101.0–100.5	—	77.5–65.0
4	Firdavs Sharipov (TJK) Firdavs Abdubanopov (TJK)	3	0	3	63.5–77.5	64.0–78.5	65.0–77.5	—

Source: OCA

==== Men's show ====
16 September

1/4 finals
Mahdi Wakili (AFG); Nazar Rezahi (AFG)
Thammanun Pothaisong (THA); Warut Netpong (THA)	DQ
Sarthak Joshi (IND); Krishna Kumar Sana (IND)	37.0
Mahmood Yaseen (IRQ); Mohanad Hasan (IRQ)	40.5
Irvan Ramadhan (INA); Very Maradona Sinaga (INA)	40.5
Ahmet Taňryberdiýew (TKM); Ýusup Taňryberdiýew (TKM)	43.5

Semifinals
Thammanun Pothaisong (THA); Warut Netpong (THA)	44.5
Mahmood Yaseen (IRQ); Mohanad Hasan (IRQ)	39.0
Ahmet Taňryberdiýew (TKM); Ýusup Taňryberdiýew (TKM)	43.0
Rafique Siddique (PAK); Shahzeb Nawaz Janjua (PAK)	44.0

Gold medal
Thammanun Pothaisong (THA); Warut Netpong (THA)	44.5
Rafique Siddique (PAK); Shahzeb Nawaz Janjua (PAK)	45.0

Bronze medals
Sarthak Joshi (IND); Krishna Kumar Sana (IND)	38.0
Ahmet Taňryberdiýew (TKM); Ýusup Taňryberdiýew (TKM)	43.0
Irvan Ramadhan (INA); Very Maradona Sinaga (INA)	43.0
Mahmood Yaseen (IRQ); Mohanad Hasan (IRQ)	39.0

==== Women's classic ====
16 September

Pos	Team	Pld	W	L	THA	TKM	VIE	PAK	TJK
1	Kunsatri Kumsroi (THA) Suphawadee Kaeosrasaen (THA)	4	4	0	—	80.0–79.0	85.0–80.0	84.5–75.5	63.0–45.5
2	Patma Hojiýewa (TKM) Jahan Durdyýewa (TKM)	4	3	1	79.0–80.0	—	76.5–74.5	DQ	77.0–55.0
3	Đào Lê Thu Trang (VIE) Đào Thị Như Quỳnh (VIE)	4	2	2	80.0–85.0	74.5–76.5	—	84.0–73.5	DQ
4	Komal Emmanuel (PAK) Sonia Manzoor (PAK)	4	1	3	75.5–84.5		73.5–84.0	—	69.0–52.0
5	Malika Boboeva (TJK) Nigora Yusupova (TJK)	4	0	4	45.5–63.0	55.0–77.0		52.0–69.0	—

Source: OCA

==== Women's show ====
16 September

Pos	Team	Pld	W	L	THA	TKM	VIE	PAK	IND
1	Kunsatri Kumsroi (THA) Suphawadee Kaeosrasaen (THA)	4	4	0	—	42.0–41.5	83.0–83.0	42.0–37.0	40.5–37.5
2	Patma Hojiýewa (TKM) Jahan Durdyýewa (TKM)	4	3	1	41.5–42.0	—	40.5–0	42.0–37.0	40.5–35.5
3	Đào Thị Như Quỳnh (VIE) Đào Lê Thu Trang (VIE)	4	2	2	83.0–83.0	0–40.5	—	40.0–38.0	41.0–36.0
4	Komal Emmanuel (PAK) Sonia Manzoor (PAK)	4	1	3	37.0–42.0	37.0–42.0	38.0–40.0	—	39.0–35.5
5	Lakhvinder Kaur (IND) Navya Pandey (IND)	4	0	4	37.5–40.5	35.5–40.5	36.0–41.0	35.5–39.0	—

Source: OCA

==== Mixed classic ====
16 September

Pos	Team	Pld	W	L	TKM	THA	PAK	TJK
1	Mekan Nurjikow (TKM) Jahan Durdyýewa (TKM)	3	3	0	—	83.5–82.5	81.5–78.5	79.0–52.5
2	Ratcharat Yimprai (THA) Kunsatri Kumsroi (THA)	3	2	1	82.5–83.5	—	80.5–75.5	86.0–62.0
3	Shahzeb Nawaz Janjua (PAK) Sonia Manzoor (PAK)	3	1	2	78.5–81.5	75.5–80.5	—	76.5–55.5
4	Firdavs Abdubanopov (TJK) Nigora Yusupova (TJK)	3	0	3	52.5–79.0	62.0–86.0	55.5–76.5	—

Source: OCA

==== Mixed show ====
16 September

===== Preliminary round =====
Pool A
Pos	Team	Pld	W	L	TKM	PAK	IND
1	Myrat Gimmiýew (TKM) Patma Hojiýewa (TKM)	2	2	0	—	41.5–39.5	41.0–38.0
2	Rafique Siddique (PAK) Komal Emmanuel (PAK)	2	1	1	39.5–41.5	—	39.0–36.0
3	Krishna Kumar Sana (IND) Navya Pandey (IND)	2	0	2	38.0–41.0	36.0–39.0	—

Pool B
Pos	Team	Pld	W	L	LBN	THA	TJK
1	Ghady Moussa (LBN) Lea Farhat (LBN)	2	2	0	—	WO	DQ
2	Thammanun Pothaisong (THA) Suphawadee Kaeosrasaen (THA)	2	1	1		—	DQ
3	Firdavs Sharipov (TJK) Malika Boboeva (TJK)	2	0	2			—

Source: OCA

===== Knockout round =====
Semifinals		Gold medal
Myrat Gimmiýew (TKM); Patma Hojiýewa (TKM)	DQ
Thammanun Pothaisong (THA); Suphawadee Kaeosrasaen (THA)		Myrat Gimmiýew (TKM); Patma Hojiýewa (TKM)	44.0
Ghady Moussa (LBN); Lea Farhat (LBN)	38.0	Rafique Siddique (PAK); Komal Emmanuel (PAK)	41.5
Rafique Siddique (PAK); Komal Emmanuel (PAK)	40.0

=== Men's contact ===
==== 62 kg ====
16 September

1/8 finals
Kuwwat Ýazlakow (TKM)	DEC
Yelaman Alzhanov (KAZ)
Nantapong Wongkuna (THA)	DQ
Rajkumar Yogi (IND)
Payoongsak Singchalad (THA)
Đào Hồng Sơn (VIE)	KO
Abubakir Zhanibek (KAZ)	SUB
Ölziitogtokhyn Erdenebaatar (MGL)

1/4 finals
Hussain Bakhsh Safari (AFG)	DEC
Kuwwat Ýazlakow (TKM)
Nantapong Wongkuna (THA)
Ariet Bekishov (KGZ)	SUB
Đào Hồng Sơn (VIE)	DEC
Mukesh Sharma (IND)
Abubakir Zhanibek (KAZ)
Dawut Nuryýew (TKM)	DEC

Semifinals
Hussain Bakhsh Safari (AFG)	DEC
Ariet Bekishov (KGZ)
Đào Hồng Sơn (VIE)
Dawut Nuryýew (TKM)	DEC

Gold medal
Hussain Bakhsh Safari (AFG)	SUB
Dawut Nuryýew (TKM)

==== 69 kg ====
16 September

1/8 finals
Banpot Lertthaisong (THA)	DQ
Lê Trọng Hoàng (VIE)

1/4 finals
Banpot Lertthaisong (THA)	DEC
Rana Waqar Umar (PAK)
Annageldi Annasähedow (TKM)	DEC
Rajendra Gupta (IND)
Ekachai Murasawa (THA)
Zhanbolat Zakarin (KAZ)	SUB
Sirojiddin Eshanbaev (UZB)
Fahraddin Abdullaýew (TKM)	DEC

Semifinals
Banpot Lertthaisong (THA)
Annageldi Annasähedow (TKM)	ACT
Zhanbolat Zakarin (KAZ)
Fahraddin Abdullaýew (TKM)	DEC

Gold medal
Annageldi Annasähedow (TKM)
Fahraddin Abdullaýew (TKM)	DEC

==== 77 kg ====
16 September

1/4 finals
Sukhrob Usmanov (UZB)	DQ
Ratcharat Yimprai (THA)
Abhijeet Sharad More (IND)
Begençmyrat Kakabaýew (TKM)	DEC
Rustam Rozmetow (TKM)	DEC
Sarut Taithanee (THA)
Mohammad Mansouri Davar (IRI)
Nurlan Yespolov (KAZ)	DQ

Semifinals
Sukhrob Usmanov (UZB)
Begençmyrat Kakabaýew (TKM)	SUB
Rustam Rozmetow (TKM)	DEC
Nurlan Yespolov (KAZ)

Gold medal
Begençmyrat Kakabaýew (TKM)	SUB
Rustam Rozmetow (TKM)

==== 85 kg ====
16 September

1/4 finals
Rüstem Penjiýew (TKM)	DEC
Sooknatee Suntra (THA)
Törtogtokhyn Otgonzayaa (MGL)	SUB
Sonet Jose (IND)

Semifinals
Rüstem Penjiýew (TKM)	SUB
Kuandyk Yesseneyev (KAZ)
Törtogtokhyn Otgonzayaa (MGL)
Wýaçeslaw Işhanýan (TKM)	DEC

Gold medal
Rüstem Penjiýew (TKM)	DEC
Wýaçeslaw Işhanýan (TKM)

=== Men's ne-waza ===
==== 56 kg ====
19 September

1/8 finals
Mirali Agaýew (TKM)	2
Firdavs Sharipov (TJK)	3
Jahanzeb Rashad Lone (PAK)	99
Kuandyk Konyssov (KAZ)	0
Reindy Allendra (INA)	0
Akmal Amirov (UZB)	2
Payoongsak Singchalad (THA)	0
Omar Al-Fadhli (UAE)	99
Sarthak Joshi (IND)	0
Gian Dee (PHI)	99
Kemal Meredow (TKM)	0
Đào Hồng Sơn (VIE)	0
Atomasa Hiroyama (THA)	99
Yelaman Alzhanov (KAZ)	0
Mohammed Ismael (IRQ)	0
Obaid Al-Nuaimi (UAE)	4

1/4 finals
Firdavs Sharipov (TJK)	0
Jahanzeb Rashad Lone (PAK)	2
Akmal Amirov (UZB)	0
Omar Al-Fadhli (UAE)	2
Gian Dee (PHI)	0
Đào Hồng Sơn (VIE)	0
Atomasa Hiroyama (THA)	0
Obaid Al-Nuaimi (UAE)	99

Semifinals
Jahanzeb Rashad Lone (PAK)	0
Omar Al-Fadhli (UAE)	0
Gian Dee (PHI)	0
Obaid Al-Nuaimi (UAE)	0

Gold medal
Omar Al-Fadhli (UAE)	2
Gian Dee (PHI)	0

Repechage final
Firdavs Sharipov (TJK)	4
Akmal Amirov (UZB)	6
Đào Hồng Sơn (VIE)	4
Atomasa Hiroyama (THA)	0

Bronze medals
Akmal Amirov (UZB)	0
Obaid Al-Nuaimi (UAE)	0
Đào Hồng Sơn (VIE)	0
Jahanzeb Rashad Lone (PAK)	99

==== 62 kg ====
19 September

1/16 finals
Amir Yahya (IRQ)	99–0	Nantapong Wongkuna (THA)
Abubakir Zhanibek (KAZ)	0–99	Firdavs Abdubanopov (TJK)
Alymgeldi Abdizhamil Uulu (KGZ)	99–0	Allamyrat Garaýew (TKM)
Ölziitogtokhyn Erdenebaatar (MGL)	99–0	Gesit Wisnu Prakoso (INA)

1/8 finals
Amir Yahya (IRQ)	99
Ýalkym Nuryýew (TKM)	0
Bolormaagiin Uugankhüü (MGL)	99
Krishna Kumar Sana (IND)	0
Firdavs Abdubanopov (TJK)	0
Murtaza Hussaini (AFG)	99
Erzhan Batyrov (KGZ)	0
Said Al-Mazrouei (UAE)	99
Alymgeldi Abdizhamil Uulu (KGZ)	99
Sukhrob Odinaev (TJK)	0
Zayed Al-Mansoori (UAE)	99
Ali Khousrof (YEM)	0
Ölziitogtokhyn Erdenebaatar (MGL)
Bye
Sarawut Petsing (THA)	0
Darkhan Nortayev (KAZ)	99

1/4 finals
Amir Yahya (IRQ)	99
Bolormaagiin Uugankhüü (MGL)	0
Murtaza Hussaini (AFG)	0
Said Al-Mazrouei (UAE)	99
Alymgeldi Abdizhamil Uulu (KGZ)	2
Zayed Al-Mansoori (UAE)	4
Ölziitogtokhyn Erdenebaatar (MGL)	99
Darkhan Nortayev (KAZ)	0

Semifinals
Amir Yahya (IRQ)	4
Said Al-Mazrouei (UAE)	0
Zayed Al-Mansoori (UAE)	0
Ölziitogtokhyn Erdenebaatar (MGL)	0

Gold medal
Amir Yahya (IRQ)	99
Zayed Al-Mansoori (UAE)	0

Repechage final
Bolormaagiin Uugankhüü (MGL)	99
Murtaza Hussaini (AFG)	0
Alymgeldi Abdizhamil Uulu (KGZ)	0
Darkhan Nortayev (KAZ)	17

Bronze medals
Bolormaagiin Uugankhüü (MGL)	0
Ölziitogtokhyn Erdenebaatar (MGL)	3
Darkhan Nortayev (KAZ)	0
Said Al-Mazrouei (UAE)	0

==== 69 kg ====
18 September

1/16 finals
Tarun Yadav (IND)	0–13	Ibrahim Al-Hosani (UAE)
Kobildzhon Mavlyanov (TJK)	WO	Sirojiddin Eshanbaev (UZB)
Marc Lim (PHI)	2–0	Erzhan Turuskeldiev (KGZ)
Mahdi Wakili (AFG)	0–99	Abdallah Nabas (JOR)
Banpot Lertthaisong (THA)	16–0	Mohamed Abudrees (BRN)
Rana Waqar Umar (PAK)	2–4	Jelilmuhammet Hojamyradow (TKM)
Ali Ahmed (IRQ)	99–0	Fikri Ramadhan (INA)
Mohammad Khair (JOR)	8–4	Zhanbolat Zakarin (KAZ)
Anjan Raman (IND)	99–0	Ghady Moussa (LBN)
Nurkalyi Mirlanov (KGZ)	20–2	Ekachai Murasawa (THA)

1/8 finals
Ibrahim Al-Hosani (UAE)	99
Kobildzhon Mavlyanov (TJK)	0
Marc Lim (PHI)	4
Arslan Setdarow (TKM)	0
Abdallah Nabas (JOR)	2
Mönkhtöriin Davaadorj (MGL)	8
Banpot Lertthaisong (THA)	0
Nartay Kazhekov (KAZ)	0
Jelilmuhammet Hojamyradow (TKM)	0
Ali Ahmed (IRQ)	99
Mohammad Khair (JOR)	0
Lê Trọng Hoàng (VIE)	0
Anjan Raman (IND)	0
Talib Al-Kirbi (UAE)	99
Nurkalyi Mirlanov (KGZ)	2
Amir Hossein Khademian (IRI)	2

1/4 finals
Ibrahim Al-Hosani (UAE)	0
Marc Lim (PHI)	3
Mönkhtöriin Davaadorj (MGL)	2
Banpot Lertthaisong (THA)	2
Ali Ahmed (IRQ)	2
Lê Trọng Hoàng (VIE)	2
Talib Al-Kirbi (UAE)	8
Nurkalyi Mirlanov (KGZ)	6

Semifinals
Marc Lim (PHI)	2
Banpot Lertthaisong (THA)	2
Ali Ahmed (IRQ)	0
Talib Al-Kirbi (UAE)	2

Gold medal
Marc Lim (PHI)	0
Talib Al-Kirbi (UAE)	2

Repechage final
Ibrahim Al-Hosani (UAE)	0
Mönkhtöriin Davaadorj (MGL)	0
Lê Trọng Hoàng (VIE)	0
Nurkalyi Mirlanov (KGZ)	99

Bronze medals
Ibrahim Al-Hosani (UAE)	0
Ali Ahmed (IRQ)	0
Nurkalyi Mirlanov (KGZ)
Banpot Lertthaisong (THA)	DQ

==== 77 kg ====
18 September

1/16 finals
Sukhrob Usmanov (UZB)	0–99	Hamzeh Al-Rasheed (JOR)
Mahdi Ebrahimi (AFG)	WO	Hansel Co (PHI)
Abhijeet Sharad More (IND)	0–99	Zakir Abbas (PAK)
Bekaiar Egemberdiev (KGZ)	4–4	Albert Aldiyarov (KAZ)
Murtazali Murtazaliev (KGZ)	11–0	Abdelmajid Faouri (JOR)
Abdumanon Rahimov (TJK)	99–0	Sarut Taithanee (THA)
Mohamed Al-Qubaisi (UAE)	WO	Abdul Hamid Mehrdil (AFG)

1/8 finals
Hamzeh Al-Rasheed (JOR)	5
Rahat Kurbanow (TKM)	0
Hansel Co (PHI)
Saoud Al-Hammadi (UAE)	DQ
Zakir Abbas (PAK)	0
Ahmed Mansoor Shebeeb (BRN)	8
Albert Aldiyarov (KAZ)	12
Ratcharat Yimprai (THA)	2
Murtazali Murtazaliev (KGZ)	0
Ali Munfaredi (BRN)	99
Abdumanon Rahimov (TJK)	2
Nurlan Yespolov (KAZ)	11
Abdul Hamid Mehrdil (AFG)	0
Mahmood Yaseen (IRQ)	0
Muhammetnur Atajanow (TKM)	0
Mohammad Mansouri Davar (IRI)	4

1/4 finals
Hamzeh Al-Rasheed (JOR)	8
Saoud Al-Hammadi (UAE)	2
Ahmed Mansoor Shebeeb (BRN)	0
Albert Aldiyarov (KAZ)	0
Ali Munfaredi (BRN)	99
Nurlan Yespolov (KAZ)	0
Abdul Hamid Mehrdil (AFG)	0
Mohammad Mansouri Davar (IRI)	99

Semifinals
Hamzeh Al-Rasheed (JOR)	5
Ahmed Mansoor Shebeeb (BRN)	0
Ali Munfaredi (BRN)	99
Mohammad Mansouri Davar (IRI)	0

Gold medal
Hamzeh Al-Rasheed (JOR)	0
Ali Munfaredi (BRN)	2

Repechage final
Saoud Al-Hammadi (UAE)	2
Albert Aldiyarov (KAZ)	0
Nurlan Yespolov (KAZ)	99
Abdul Hamid Mehrdil (AFG)	0

Bronze medals
Saoud Al-Hammadi (UAE)	6
Mohammad Mansouri Davar (IRI)	3
Nurlan Yespolov (KAZ)	0
Ahmed Mansoor Shebeeb (BRN)	5

- Ahmed Mansoor Shebeeb of Bahrain originally won the bronze medal, but was disqualified after he tested positive for Mesterolone.

==== 85 kg ====
18 September

1/16 finals
Bektur Tynybekov (KGZ)	2–2	Sooknatee Suntra (THA)
Döwran Myradow (TKM)	4–9	Kuandyk Yesseneyev (KAZ)
Rasuljon Muhammedov (TJK)	WO	Nazar Rezahi (AFG)
Andrey Gavrilyuk (KAZ)	24–2	Abdughafur Abdulloev (TJK)
Amir Faris (IRQ)	WO	Haidar Al-Rasheed (JOR)
Ali Ebrahimi (BRN)	99–0	Harout Karaoghlanian (LBN)

1/8 finals
Sooknatee Suntra (THA)	0
Khalfan Balhol (UAE)	12
Kuandyk Yesseneyev (KAZ)	99
Budi Hermanto (INA)	0
Rasuljon Muhammedov (TJK)	0
Nijad Al-Gosaibi (BRN)	99
Bader Al-Kuzai (JOR)	99
Vinay Kumar Joshi (IND)	0
Andrey Gavrilyuk (KAZ)	0
Abdurahmanhaji Murtazaliev (KGZ)	0
Haidar Al-Rasheed (JOR)	99
Riza Safarov (UZB)	0
Ali Ebrahimi (BRN)	0
Mergen Joraýew (TKM)	18
Salem Al-Suwaidi (UAE)	99
Deepak Pandey (IND)	0

1/4 finals
Khalfan Balhol (UAE)	99
Kuandyk Yesseneyev (KAZ)	0
Nijad Al-Gosaibi (BRN)	0
Bader Al-Kuzai (JOR)	99
Abdurahmanhaji Murtazaliev (KGZ)	0
Haidar Al-Rasheed (JOR)	0
Mergen Joraýew (TKM)	0
Salem Al-Suwaidi (UAE)	0

Semifinals
Khalfan Balhol (UAE)	6
Bader Al-Kuzai (JOR)	0
Abdurahmanhaji Murtazaliev (KGZ)	0
Mergen Joraýew (TKM)	0

Gold medal
Khalfan Balhol (UAE)	2
Abdurahmanhaji Murtazaliev (KGZ)	2

Repechage final
Kuandyk Yesseneyev (KAZ)	DQ
Nijad Al-Gosaibi (BRN)
Haidar Al-Rasheed (JOR)	5
Salem Al-Suwaidi (UAE)	0

Bronze medals
Kuandyk Yesseneyev (KAZ)	0
Mergen Joraýew (TKM)	99
Haidar Al-Rasheed (JOR)	99
Bader Al-Kuzai (JOR)	0

==== 94 kg ====
18 September

1/8 finals
Mohsen Hamidi (IRI)	0
Jonibek Atajanow (TKM)	4
Faisal Al-Ketbi (UAE)	5
Ramazan Kussainov (KAZ)	0

1/4 finals
Jonibek Atajanow (TKM)	99
Gilbert Ombao (PHI)	0
Muhammad Abid (PAK)	0
Zayed Al-Kaabi (UAE)	99
Faisal Al-Ketbi (UAE)	DQ
Nejimetdin Çaryýew (TKM)
Baasandorjiin Ariuntsog (MGL)	0
Zaid Granduke (JOR)	7

Semifinals
Jonibek Atajanow (TKM)	0
Zayed Al-Kaabi (UAE)	2
Faisal Al-Ketbi (UAE)	0
Zaid Granduke (JOR)	0

Gold medal
Zayed Al-Kaabi (UAE)	0
Faisal Al-Ketbi (UAE)	99

Repechage final
Gilbert Ombao (PHI)	0
Muhammad Abid (PAK)	3
Nejimetdin Çaryýew (TKM)	0
Baasandorjiin Ariuntsog (MGL)	99

Bronze medals
Muhammad Abid (PAK)	0
Zaid Granduke (JOR)	99
Baasandorjiin Ariuntsog (MGL)	0
Jonibek Atajanow (TKM)	99

==== +94 kg ====
18 September

1/8 finals
Jad Fadel (LBN)	3
Mubarak Basharhil (UAE)	0
Ravshankhon Khusanov (UZB)	7
Alaa Issa (IRQ)	0
Mergen Tejenow (TKM)	0
Hiro Lemaire (TAH)	0
Natdanai Netthip (THA)	0
Masoud Hassanzadeh (IRI)	2
Nasibjan Izbasarow (TKM)	99
Mickel Roberto (INA)	0
Jay Bhagwan (IND)	0
Yahya Al-Hammadi (UAE)	99
Hamid Ali (PAK)	99
Ahmad Reshad Eshani (AFG)	0
Masoud Jalilvand (IRI)	0
Sabri Hashem Baj (JOR)	0

1/4 finals
Jad Fadel (LBN)	99
Ravshankhon Khusanov (UZB)	0
Mergen Tejenow (TKM)	0
Masoud Hassanzadeh (IRI)	99
Nasibjan Izbasarow (TKM)	2
Yahya Al-Hammadi (UAE)	0
Hamid Ali (PAK)	0
Masoud Jalilvand (IRI)	2

Semifinals
Jad Fadel (LBN)	0
Masoud Hassanzadeh (IRI)	99
Nasibjan Izbasarow (TKM)	0
Masoud Jalilvand (IRI)	2

Gold medal
Masoud Hassanzadeh (IRI)	2
Masoud Jalilvand (IRI)	2

Repechage final
Ravshankhon Khusanov (UZB)	0
Mergen Tejenow (TKM)	0
Yahya Al-Hammadi (UAE)	3
Hamid Ali (PAK)	0

Bronze medals
Ravshankhon Khusanov (UZB)	2
Nasibjan Izbasarow (TKM)	2
Yahya Al-Hammadi (UAE)	99
Jad Fadel (LBN)	0

==== Openweight ====
19 September

1/8 finals
Masoud Hassanzadeh (IRI)	99
Haidar Al-Rasheed (JOR)	0

1/4 finals
Masoud Hassanzadeh (IRI)	DQ
Jonibek Atajanow (TKM)
Yahya Al-Hammadi (UAE)	2
Marc Lim (PHI)	0
Bye
Masoud Jalilvand (IRI)
Zaid Granduke (JOR)	0
Faisal Al-Ketbi (UAE)	2

Semifinals
Masoud Hassanzadeh (IRI)	2
Yahya Al-Hammadi (UAE)	2
Masoud Jalilvand (IRI)	0
Faisal Al-Ketbi (UAE)	0

Gold medal
Masoud Hassanzadeh (IRI)
Faisal Al-Ketbi (UAE)	DQ

=== Women's ne-waza ===
==== 45 kg ====
19 September

1/8 finals
Meggie Ochoa (PHI)	99
Runchana Boonrueang (THA)	0

1/4 finals
Meggie Ochoa (PHI)	13
Dinara Jumadurdyýewa (TKM)	2
Keerthana Nallakkandy (IND)	0
Wadima Al-Yafei (UAE)	99
Reem Abdulkareem (UAE)	0
Đào Lê Thu Trang (VIE)	2
Amina Halyllaýewa (TKM)	99
Navya Pandey (IND)	0

Semifinals
Meggie Ochoa (PHI)	99
Wadima Al-Yafei (UAE)	0
Đào Lê Thu Trang (VIE)	2
Amina Halyllaýewa (TKM)	0

Gold medal
Meggie Ochoa (PHI)	5
Đào Lê Thu Trang (VIE)	0

Repechage final
Dinara Jumadurdyýewa (TKM)	99
Keerthana Nallakkandy (IND)	0
Reem Abdulkareem (UAE)	DQ
Navya Pandey (IND)

Bronze medals
Dinara Jumadurdyýewa (TKM)	11
Amina Halyllaýewa (TKM)	0
Reem Abdulkareem (UAE)	3
Wadima Al-Yafei (UAE)	0

==== 49 kg ====
19 September

1/8 finals
Santi Apriyani Savitri (INA)	0
Suwanan Boonsorn (THA)	99
Arsha Valodeth Meethal (IND)	0
Dương Thị Thanh Minh (VIE)	99

1/4 finals
Suwanan Boonsorn (THA)	99
Rohini Kalam (IND)	0
Caroline Pajaron (PHI)	DQ
Ulýana Nazarowa (TKM)
Dương Thị Thanh Minh (VIE)	0
Gülbahar Madreýmowa (TKM)	0
Malika Boboeva (TJK)	0
Mouza Al-Shamsi (UAE)	10

Semifinals
Suwanan Boonsorn (THA)	99
Caroline Pajaron (PHI)	0
Gülbahar Madreýmowa (TKM)	2
Mouza Al-Shamsi (UAE)	2

Gold medal
Suwanan Boonsorn (THA)	99
Mouza Al-Shamsi (UAE)	0

Repechage final
Rohini Kalam (IND)	0
Ulýana Nazarowa (TKM)	99
Dương Thị Thanh Minh (VIE)	99
Malika Boboeva (TJK)	0

Bronze medals
Ulýana Nazarowa (TKM)	0
Gülbahar Madreýmowa (TKM)	0
Dương Thị Thanh Minh (VIE)	9
Caroline Pajaron (PHI)	0

==== 55 kg ====
19 September

1/8 finals
Kaila Napolis (PHI)	0
Madina Aýdogdyýewa (TKM)	0
Cornelia Lumban Tobing (INA)	0
Mönkhgereliin Bayarmaa (MGL)	99
Nigora Yusupova (TJK)	14
Shanila Kavile Valappil (IND)	0
Tatchapan Srisamer (THA)	0
Mahra Al-Hinaai (UAE)	12
Galina Duvanova (KAZ)	99
Lea Farhat (LBN)	0
Archana Vishwanath Sharma (IND)	0
Siramol Deepudsa (THA)	99
Sampilyn Solongogerel (MGL)	0
Angelina Filippowa (TKM)	0

1/4 finals
Kaila Napolis (PHI)	0
Mönkhgereliin Bayarmaa (MGL)	0
Nigora Yusupova (TJK)	2
Mahra Al-Hinaai (UAE)	4
Galina Duvanova (KAZ)	0
Siramol Deepudsa (THA)	7
Sampilyn Solongogerel (MGL)	0
Annie Ramirez (PHI)	99

Semifinals
Kaila Napolis (PHI)	0
Mahra Al-Hinaai (UAE)	0
Siramol Deepudsa (THA)	2
Annie Ramirez (PHI)	13

Gold medal
Kaila Napolis (PHI)	0
Annie Ramirez (PHI)	5

Repechage final
Mönkhgereliin Bayarmaa (MGL)	99
Nigora Yusupova (TJK)	0
Galina Duvanova (KAZ)	99
Sampilyn Solongogerel (MGL)	0

Bronze medals
Mönkhgereliin Bayarmaa (MGL)	4
Siramol Deepudsa (THA)	9
Galina Duvanova (KAZ)	10
Mahra Al-Hinaai (UAE)	0

==== 62 kg ====
18 September

1/8 finals
Orapa Senatham (THA)	99
Tahira Sultani (AFG)	0
Nasim Mohammadi (IRI)	3
Hessa Al-Shamsi (UAE)	0
Saranya Vazha Valappil (IND)	0
Ruba Al-Sayegh (JOR)	99
Apichaya Mingkhwan (THA)	0
Wioletta Krowýakowa (TKM)	4
Apryl Eppinger (PHI)	0
Battsogtyn Buyandelger (MGL)	2
Bashayer Al-Matrooshi (UAE)	16
Lakhvinder Kaur (IND)	0
Tita Adinda Putri (INA)	99
Ramzia Saidi (AFG)	0

1/4 finals
Orapa Senatham (THA)	99
Nasim Mohammadi (IRI)	0
Ruba Al-Sayegh (JOR)	3
Maral Öwezgeldiýewa (TKM)	0
Wioletta Krowýakowa (TKM)	0
Battsogtyn Buyandelger (MGL)	0
Bashayer Al-Matrooshi (UAE)	4
Tita Adinda Putri (INA)	3

Semifinals
Orapa Senatham (THA)	99
Ruba Al-Sayegh (JOR)	0
Battsogtyn Buyandelger (MGL)	99
Bashayer Al-Matrooshi (UAE)	0

Gold medal
Orapa Senatham (THA)	2
Battsogtyn Buyandelger (MGL)	0

Repechage final
Nasim Mohammadi (IRI)	0
Maral Öwezgeldiýewa (TKM)	3
Wioletta Krowýakowa (TKM)	99
Tita Adinda Putri (INA)	0

Bronze medals
Maral Öwezgeldiýewa (TKM)	5
Bashayer Al-Matrooshi (UAE)	15
Wioletta Krowýakowa (TKM)	0
Ruba Al-Sayegh (JOR)	2

==== 70 kg ====
18 September

1/8 finals
Tsogt-Ochiryn Battsetseg (MGL)	99
Leýla Muhammedowa (TKM)	0
Onanong Sangsirichok (THA)	99
Lou-Ann Jindani (PHI)	0
Rana Qubbaj (JOR)	99
Mönkh-Erdeniin Bayartuul (MGL)	0

1/4 finals
Tsogt-Ochiryn Battsetseg (MGL)	99
Nafisa Ahmadi (AFG)	0
Onanong Sangsirichok (THA)	5
Nina Kim (KAZ)	0
Rana Qubbaj (JOR)	99
Simone Julia (INA)	0
Ogulsat Nurmedowa (TKM)	0
Nitchanan Tubsai (THA)	13

Semifinals
Tsogt-Ochiryn Battsetseg (MGL)	99
Onanong Sangsirichok (THA)	0
Rana Qubbaj (JOR)	99
Nitchanan Tubsai (THA)	0

Gold medal
Tsogt-Ochiryn Battsetseg (MGL)	0
Rana Qubbaj (JOR)	0

Repechage final
Nafisa Ahmadi (AFG)	0
Nina Kim (KAZ)	99
Simone Julia (INA)	0
Ogulsat Nurmedowa (TKM)	0

Bronze medals
Nina Kim (KAZ)	99
Nitchanan Tubsai (THA)	0
Simone Julia (INA)
Onanong Sangsirichok (THA)	DQ

==== +70 kg ====
19 September

1/8 finals
Myagmaryn Sugar (MGL)	14
Zulfiya Mukhamediyarova (KAZ)	0
Amna Rasheed (PAK)
Sabina Agajanowa (TKM)	DQ

1/4 finals
Iram Kanwal (PAK)	0
Aýsoltan Garçowowa (TKM)	6
Myagmaryn Sugar (MGL)	3
Luma Qubbaj (JOR)	0
Sabina Agajanowa (TKM)	0
Ishtar Ali (IRQ)	0
Salwa Al-Ali (UAE)	0
Soudeh Kamandani (IRI)	2

Semifinals
Aýsoltan Garçowowa (TKM)	0
Myagmaryn Sugar (MGL)	0
Sabina Agajanowa (TKM)	6
Soudeh Kamandani (IRI)	0

Gold medal
Aýsoltan Garçowowa (TKM)	11
Sabina Agajanowa (TKM)	0

Repechage final
Iram Kanwal (PAK)	DQ
Luma Qubbaj (JOR)
Ishtar Ali (IRQ)	99
Salwa Al-Ali (UAE)	0

Bronze medals
Iram Kanwal (PAK)	0
Soudeh Kamandani (IRI)	2
Ishtar Ali (IRQ)	0
Myagmaryn Sugar (MGL)	99

==== Openweight ====
19 September

1/8 finals
Soudeh Kamandani (IRI)
Myagmaryn Sugar (MGL)	DQ
Kaila Napolis (PHI)	0
Rana Qubbaj (JOR)	8
Annie Ramirez (PHI)	0
Nina Kim (KAZ)	5
Tsogt-Ochiryn Battsetseg (MGL)	99
Sabina Agajanowa (TKM)	0

1/4 finals
Myagmaryn Sugar (MGL)	6
Aýsoltan Garçowowa (TKM)	2
Rana Qubbaj (JOR)	DQ
Bashayer Al-Matrooshi (UAE)
Nina Kim (KAZ)	0
Ruba Al-Sayegh (JOR)	99
Tsogt-Ochiryn Battsetseg (MGL)	99
Onanong Sangsirichok (THA)	0

Semifinals
Myagmaryn Sugar (MGL)	8
Rana Qubbaj (JOR)	0
Ruba Al-Sayegh (JOR)	0
Tsogt-Ochiryn Battsetseg (MGL)	5

Gold medal
Myagmaryn Sugar (MGL)	0
Tsogt-Ochiryn Battsetseg (MGL)	5
