= Indonesia at the 2017 Asian Indoor and Martial Arts Games =

- IOC code: INA
- NOC: Indonesian Olympic Committee
- Website: www.nocindonesia.or.id (in English)

in Ashgabat
- Competitors: 99 in 12 sports
- Medals Ranked 21st: Gold 2 Silver 4 Bronze 14 Total 20

Asian Indoor and Martial Arts Games appearances
- 2005; 2007; 2009; 2013; 2017; 2021; 2026

Indonesia participated in the 2017 Asian Indoor and Martial Arts Games in Ashgabat, Turkmenistan on 17–27 September 2017. Indonesia sent 99 athletes who competed in 12 different sports.

== Competitors ==
Sport	Men	Women	Total
3x3 basketball	4	4	8
Belt wrestling	3	4	7
Bowling	4	4	8
Chess	5	4	9
Tennis	5	5	10
Ju-jitsu	7	4	11
Kurash	3	4	7
Sambo	4	2	6
Taekwondo	5	5	10
Track cycling	2	2	4
Traditional wrestling	1	3	4
Weightlifting	3	3	6
Wrestling	5	4	9
Total	52	47	99

== Medal summary ==
=== Medal table ===
Sport	Gold	Silver	Bronze	Total
Alysh	0	0	2	2
Bowling	0	1	1	2
Chess	0	1	1	2
Indoor tennis	1	1	2	4
Ju-jitsu	0	0	1	1
Sambo	0	0	1	1
Taekwondo	1	1	3	5
Track cycling	0	0	1	1
Traditional wrestling	0	0	1	1
Weightlifting	0	0	1	1
Total	2	4	14	20

=== Medalists ===
Medal	Name	Sport	Event	Date
Gold	Maulana Haidir; Muhammad Wahyu; Muhammad Alfi Kusuma	Taekwondo	Men's team poomsae	22 September
Gold	Beatrice Gumulya	Indoor tennis	Women's singles	26 September
Silver	Tannya Roumimper	Bowling	Women's singles	22 September
Silver	Defia Rosmaniar; Mutiara Habiba; Ruhil	Taekwondo	Women's team poomsae	22 September
Silver	Irene Kharisma Sukandar; Medina Warda Aulia	Chess	Women's rapid team	26 September
Silver	Aldila Sutjiadi	Indoor tennis	Women's singles	26 September
Bronze	Irvan Ramadhan; Veri Maradona Sinaga	Ju-jitsu	Men's duo show	16 September
Bronze	Anita Dwi Nengrum	Traditional wrestling	Women's freestyle –70 kg	16 September
Bronze	Dhean Titania Fazrin	Taekwondo	Women's –46 kg	18 September
Bronze	Mariska Halinda	Taekwondo	Women's –53 kg	19 September
Bronze	Crismonita Dwi Putri	Track cycling	Women's sprint	20 September
Bronze	Acchedya Jagaddhita	Weightlifting	Women's 58 kg	20 September
Bronze	Dian Putri Rahmaniah	Alysh	Women's Alysh Free –55 kg	22 September
Bronze	Ridha Wahdaniyati Ridwan	Alysh	Women's Alysh Free –75 kg	22 September
Bronze	Defia Rosmaniar	Taekwondo	Women's individual poomsae	22 September
Bronze	Muhammad Rifqi Fitriadi; Deria Nur Haliza	Indoor tennis	Mixed doubles	23 September
Bronze	Jessy Rompies; Lavinia Tananta	Indoor tennis	Women's doubles	25 September
Bronze	Mutiara Amanda	Sambo	Women's –64 kg	25 September
Bronze	Diwan Rezaldy Syahril; Fachri Ibnu Askar; Billy Muhammad Islam; Hardy Rachmadian	Bowling	Men's team of four	26 September
Bronze	Chelsie Monica Ignesias Sihite; Ummi Fisabilillah	Chess	Women's blitz team under-23	27 September
