= Iraq at the 2017 Asian Indoor and Martial Arts Games =

- IOC code: IRQ
- NOC: National Olympic Committee of Iraq
- Website: www.iraqiolympic.org

in Ashgabat 17–27 September
- Competitors: 51 in 10 sports
- Medals: Gold 4 Silver 3 Bronze 6 Total 13

Asian Indoor and Martial Arts Games appearances
- 2005; 2007; 2009; 2013; 2017; 2021; 2025

Iraq competed at the 2017 Asian Indoor and Martial Arts Games in Ashgabat, Turkmenistan from September 17 to 27. Iraq won 13 medals during the multi-sport event including 4 gold medals. Iraq sent a delegation consisting of 51 participants for the event.

== 3x3 Basketball ==
Iraq men's national 3x3 basketball team secured the silver medal after emerging as the runners-up in the men's category by beating Qatar with a score of 22-12 in the finals.

== Participants ==
Sport	Men	Women	Total
3x3 basketball	4	0	4
Jujitsu	7	1	8
Kickboxing	8	0	8
Kurash	6	0	6
MuayThai	7	0	7
Indoor Athletics	2	0	2
Sambo	4	0	4
Weightlifting	3	1	4
Taekwondo	4	0	4
Wrestling	4	0	4

== Medallists ==
Medal	Name	Sport	Event
Gold	Al-Bazi Amir Yahyaa Abdulameer	Ju Jitsu	Men's Ne-Waza 62 kg
Gold	Alkhineefir Rikan	Kickboxing	Men's full contact 75 kg
Gold	Fazil Shahez	MuayThai	Men's 86 kg
Gold	Aljumaili Safaa	Weightlifting	Men's 85 kg
Silver	Iraq national 3x3 team	3x3 basketball	Men's tournament
Silver	Alsaemary Abdulkhaleq	Kickboxing	Men's low kick - 51 kg
Silver	Al-Asadi Hayder	Kickboxing	Men's point fighting - 69 kg
Bronze	Al-Mntfage Adnan Taes Agar	Indoor Athletics	Men's 1500m
Bronze	Al Alabd Ali Ahmed Sabah	Jujitsu	Men's Ne-Waza 69 kg
Bronze	Takealla Ameer	MuayThai	Men's 63.5 kg
Bronze	Al-Tekreeti Mustafa	MuayThai	Men's 75 kg
Bronze	Alaifuri Salwan	Weightlifting	Men's 105 kg
Bronze	Al-Hussein Ahmed	Weightlifting	Men's 77 kg
