= Nepal at the 2017 Asian Indoor and Martial Arts Games =

- IOC code: NEP
- NOC: Nepal Olympic Committee
- Website: www.nocnepal.org.np

in Ashgabat 17–27 September
- Competitors: 18 in 8 sports
- Medals: Gold 0 Silver 0 Bronze 0 Total 0

Asian Indoor and Martial Arts Games appearances
- 2005; 2007; 2009; 2013; 2017; 2021; 2025

Nepal competed at the 2017 Asian Indoor and Martial Arts Games in Ashgabat, Turkmenistan from 17 to 27 September 2017 with sending a delegation of 18 competitors for the event. Nepal couldn't receive any medal at the multi-sport event.

== Participants ==
Sport	Men	Women	Total
3x3 basketball	4	0	4
Chess	1	1	2
Kickboxing	2	0	2
Kurash	1	2	3
May Thai	1	0	1
Short course swimming	1	1	2
Taekwondo	1	1	2
Weightlifting	1	1	2
