= Abdul-Khaliq Sabih =

Iraqi kickboxer

Abdulkhaleq Sabeeh
- Born: 4 January 1991 (age 35); Basra, Iraq
- Nationality: Iraq
- Height: 1.60 m (5 ft 3 in)
- Weight: 51 kg (112 lb; 8.0 st)
- Style: Point fighting
- Fighting out of: Basra, Iraq

Abdulkhaleq Sabeeh Maeedi (born 4 January 1991) is an Iraqi kickboxer. He was the 2017 Asian Indoor and Martial Arts Games champion, the 2019 world champion and the champion of Iraq since 2010. His weight is 51 kg.

== Titles and accomplishments ==
- 2011 World Kickboxing Championships in Russia ( 51 kg) Gold medalist
- 2012 Russia Kickboxing Championship ( 51 kg) Gold medalist
- 2013 World Kickboxing Championships in Russia ( 51 kg) Silver medalist
- 2014 Arab Martial Arts Championship in Morocco ( 51 kg) Gold medalist
- 2015 Kickboxing Professional Championship in Kazakhstan ( 51 kg) Gold medalist
- 2016 Arab Martial Arts Championship in Jordan( 51 kg) Gold medalist
- 2017 Kickboxing at the 2017 Asian Indoor and Martial Arts Games( 51 kg) Gold medalist
- 2017 Asian Indoor and Martial Arts Games( 51 kg) Silver medalist
- 2019 World Kickboxing Championships in Russia( 51 kg) Gold medalist
