= Rikan Lateef =

Iraqi kickboxer

- Born: September 5, 1990 (age 36); Basra, Iraq
- Nationality: Iraq
- Height: 1.85 m (6 ft 1 in)
- Weight: 75 kg (165 lb; 11.8 st)
- Style: Point fighting
- Fighting out of: Basra, Iraq

Rikan Lateef Kadhim Alkhineefir (born October 5, 1990) is an Iraqi kickboxer . he is the 2017 Asian Indoor and Martial Arts Games. The world champion 2019 and the champion of Iraq since 2013 until now, in a weight of 75 kg.

== Titles and accomplishments ==
- 2019 World Kickboxing Championships in Russia ( 75 kg) Gold medalist
- 2017 Kickboxing at the 2017 Asian Indoor and Martial Arts Games ( 75 kg) Gold medalist
- 2017 Asian Indoor and Martial Arts Games ( 75 kg) Gold medalist
- 2016 Arabian Kickboxing Championship (75 kg) Bronze medalist
- 2014 Arabian Kickboxing Championship (75 kg) Bronze medalist
- 2013 World Kickboxing Championships in Russia ( 75 kg) Bronze medalist
