= Syria at the 2017 Asian Indoor and Martial Arts Games =

- IOC code: SYR
- NOC: Syrian Olympic Committee
- Website: www.syriaolymp.org

in Ashgabat 17–27 September
- Competitors: 28 in 9 sports
- Medals: Gold 1 Silver 0 Bronze 5 Total 6

Asian Indoor and Martial Arts Games appearances
- 2005; 2007; 2009; 2013; 2017; 2021; 2025

Syria competed as Syrian Arab Republic in the 2017 Asian Indoor and Martial Arts Games held in Ashgabat, Turkmenistan from September 17 to 27. Syria sent a delegation consisting of 28 competitors for the multi-sport event competing in 9 different sports.

Syrian team won a tally of 6 medals including a gold medal.

== Participants ==
Sport	Men	Women	Total
Kurash	3	3	6
Sambo	3	3	6
3×3 basketball	0	4	4
Equestrian jumping	4	0	4
Kickboxing	3	1	4
Belt Wrestling	1	0	1
Indoor Athletics	1	0	1
Wrestling	1	0	1
Muaythai	1	0	1

== Medallists ==
Medal	Name	Sport	Event
Gold	Ghazal Majd Eddin	Indoor Athletics	Men's High jump
Bronze	Syria equestrian team	Equestrian jumping	Equestrian team event
Bronze	Alhasan Ibrahim	Kickboxing	Men's full contact – 57 kg
Bronze	Al Saed Wael	Kickboxing	Men's low kick – 81 kg
Bronze	Saied Hasna	Kurash	Women's – 63 kg
Bronze	Al krad Raja	Wrestling	Men's freestyle – 125 kg
