= Mohammad Reza Saeidi =

Iranian professional jujitsu and sambo athlete

Personal information
- Full name: Seyed Mohammad Reza Saeidi Madani
- Nationality: Iranian
- Born: 19 June 1987 (age 39) Tehran, Tehran Province, Iran
- Education: Physical Education
- Height: 181 cm (5 ft 11 in)
- Weight: 85 kg (187 lb)

Sport
- Country: Iran
- Sport: judo, jiujitsu, sambo
- Event: sambo Judo(sport)
Medal record
Representing Iran
Men's Fighting
World Sambo Championships
Bronze medal – third place	2021 Tashkant	-88 kg
Asian Indoor and Martial Arts Games Championships
Bronze medal – third place	2017 Ashgabat	-68 kg
Asian Sambo Championships
Bronze medal – third place	2022 Beirut	-88 kg
Silver medal – second place	2021 Tashkant	-88 kg
Bronze medal – third place	2017 Tashkant	-68 kg
Islamic Solidarity Games
Bronze medal – third place	2021 Turkey KONYA	Teams competition
CSIT World Judo Sports Games
Gold medal – first place	2019 Spain	-81 kg

Seyed Mohammad Reza Saeidi Madani (Persian: سید محمدرضا سعیدی مدنی, born 19 June 1987 in Tehran) is an Iranian Judo, Sambo and jiujitsu athlete. He is captain of the Iran Judo national team. He won the bronze medal at the 2017 Asian Indoor and Martial Arts Games in Ashgabat. He won first medal in the history of Iranian Sambo at the 2021 Sambo World Championships in Tashkent, Uzbekistan and the 2nd place at the 2021 Sambo Asian Championships in Uzbekistan and the 3rd place at the 2022 Sambo Asian Championships in Lebanon. He won the Gold Medal at the 2019 CSIT World Sport Games in Spain. He is a Member of the Iranian Jiujitsu National Team during the 2018 Jiujitsu World Championship in the United Arab Emirates. He won the bronze medal at the 2021 Islamic Solidarity Games in Konya, Turkey.
