= Behruzi Khojazoda =

Tajikistani judoka

Personal information
- Born: 11 January 1995 (age 31) Dushanbe, Tajikistan
- Occupation: Judoka
- Height: 180 cm (5 ft 11 in)

Sport
- Country: Tajikistan
- Sport: Judo, Kurash, Sambo
- Weight class: ‍–‍73 kg

Achievements and titles
- Olympic Games: R32 (2024)
- World Champ.: 5th (2019)
- Asian Champ.: (bronze) (2023)
Medal record
Representing Tajikistan
Men's judo
Asian Games
Bronze medal – third place	2023 Hangzhou	‍–‍73 kg
World Masters
Silver medal – second place	2023 Budapest	‍–‍73 kg
IJF Grand Slam
Silver medal – second place	2024 Dushanbe	‍–‍73 kg
Bronze medal – third place	2019 Ekaterinburg	‍–‍73 kg
IJF Grand Prix
Silver medal – second place	2019 Tashkent	‍–‍73 kg
Silver medal – second place	2023 Dushanbe	‍–‍73 kg
Men's kurash
Asian Games
Silver medal – second place	2018 Jakarta	‍–‍81 kg
Asian Indoor and Martial Arts Games
Silver medal – second place	2017 Ashgabat	‍–‍73 kg
Men's sambo
World Championships
Gold medal – first place	2017 Sochi	‍–‍74 kg
Asian Indoor and Martial Arts Games
Gold medal – first place	2017 Ashgabat	‍–‍74 kg
Asian Championships
Gold medal – first place	2017 Tashkent	‍–‍68 kg

Profile at external databases
- IJF: 17191
- JudoInside.com: 93112
- Updated on 29 July 2024

Behruzi Khojazoda (born 11 January 1995) is a Tajikistani male kurash practitioner as well as a judoka who has represented Tajikistan in several international competitive events.

He represented Tajikistan at the 2018 Asian Games and claimed silver medal in the men's 81kg kurash event. Behruzi also competed in the men's judo 73kg event during the 2018 Asian Games.
