= Yemen at the 2017 Asian Indoor and Martial Arts Games =

- IOC code: YEM
- NOC: Yemen Olympic Committee
- Website: www.nocyemen.org

in Ashgabat 17–27 September
- Competitors: 7 in 4 sports
- Medals: Gold 0 Silver 0 Bronze 0 Total 0

Asian Indoor and Martial Arts Games appearances
- 2005; 2007; 2009; 2013; 2017; 2021; 2025

Yemen competed at the 2017 Asian Indoor and Martial Arts Games held in Ashgabat, Turkmenistan from September 17 to 27. Yemen sent a delegation consisting of 7 participants for the event competing in 4 different sports.

Yemeni team couldn't receive any medal in the multi-sport event.

== Participants ==
Sport	Men	Women	Total
Kurash	3	0	3
Sambo	2	0	2
Kickboxing	1	0	1
Ju Jitsu	1	0	1
