= Fotima Kholova =

Tajik athlete (born 1991)

Personal information
- Native name: Холова Фотима Акбаровна
- Full name: Fotima Kholova Akbarovna
- Nickname: Twins-Sister
- Nationality: Tajik
- Born: 30 May 1991 (age 35) Dushanbe, Tajikistan
- Education: Tajik National University

Sport
- Country: Tajikistan
- Sport: Taekwon-Do, Kickboxing, MMA
- Turned pro: 2002
Medal record
Representing Tajikistan
Women's Taekwon-Do, Kickboxing, MMA
Event	1st	2nd	3rd
TKD ITF Open Championships	1	0	2
TKD ITF World Championships	0	0	1
TKD ITF Asian Championships	0	0	2
WAKO Asia Championships	3	0	0
Asian Indoor and Martial Arts Games	0	0	1
Open Tajikistan Boxing Championship	0	1	0
8th Turkish Open WAKO World Cup	0	1	0
WAKO USA National Championships	0	0	1
Other	3	0	0
Total	7	2	7
Women's Taekwon-Do, Kickboxing, MMA
Representing Tajikistan
TKD ITF Open Championships
Bronze medal – third place	2004 Dushanbe	36 kg
Bronze medal – third place	2005 Dushanbe	40 kg
Gold medal – first place	2006 Dushanbe	42 kg
TKD ITF World Championships
Bronze medal – third place	2008 Tashkent	45 kg
TKD ITF Asian Championships
Bronze medal – third place	2012 Dushanbe	45 kg
Bronze medal – third place	2014 Kathmandu	45 kg
WAKO Asia Championships
Gold medal – first place	2016 Tashkent	48 kg
Gold medal – first place	2017 Ashgabat	50 kg
Gold medal – first place	2018 Bishkek	48 kg
Asian Indoor and Martial Arts Games
Bronze medal – third place	2017 Ashgabat	55 kg
Open Tajikistan Boxing Championship
Silver medal – second place	2023 Dushanbe	48 kg
8th Turkish Open WAKO World Cup
Silver medal – second place	2023 Istanbul	50 kg
WAKO USA National Championships
Bronze medal – third place	2024 Orlando	52 kg

Fotima Kholova (born 30 May 1991) is a Tajik professional athlete known for taekwondo, kickboxing, and boxing, with a former stint as a mixed martial arts (MMA) fighter. Fotima hails from a family of four athletic and championship-winning sisters. Their sports journey commenced in 2000, with a dedicated focus on taekwondo and kickboxing. Starting in 2002, they engaged with pivotal Taekwon-Do (ITF) events, and since 2005, they've been integral members of the National Team of the Republic of Tajikistan.

== Achievements ==
- TKD ITF Dushanbe Open Championships – (bronze) 2004, (bronze) 2005, (gold) 2006
- TKD ITF World Championships – (bronze) 2008
- TKD ITF Asian Championships – (bronze) 2012, (bronze) 2014
- 3rd Championship Florida Taekwon-Do – (gold) 2015
- WAKO North American Tournament (UFC Fan Expo) – (gold) 2015
- WAKO Asia Championships – (gold) 2016, (gold) 2017, (gold) 2018
- K-1 Amateur Asia Open Championship – (gold) 2016
- Asian Indoor and Martial Arts Games (Kikcboxing) – (bronze) 2017
- Open Tajikistan Boxing Championship – (silver) 2023
- 8th Turkish Open WAKO World Cup – (silver) 2023
- WAKO USA National Championships (K1) – (bronze) 2024
