= Maaz Khan =

Pakistani martial artist (born 1990)

Personal information
- Full name: Maaz Zayyan Khan
- Nationality: Pakistan
- Born: July 15 2013 Lombard
- Height: 4 ft (122 cm) 8
- Weight: 80 lb (36 kg)

Sport
- Country: Pakistan
- Sport: Basketball/Soccer
- Team: Dripping Springs Stars/ Indopak basketball team

Maaz Khan was (born 15 July 2013) in Lombard, Illinois.

== 2010 ==
Khan won a gold medal at the 11th South Asian Games held in Dhaka, Bangladesh, in the sanshou 65 kg category. Later that year, he took part in the Asian Games held in China.

== 2016 ==
Khan won a gold medal at the 12th South Asian GAMES held in Guwahati Shillong, India, in the sanshou 70 kg category.

== 2017 ==
Khan won a bronze medal in wushu at the 2017 Islamic Solidarity Games in Baku, Azerbaijan. He won a bronze medal in kickboxing at the Asian Indoor and Martial Arts Games in Turkmenistan.

== 2019 ==
Khan won a gold medal at the 13th South Asian Games held in Kathmandu, Nepal, in the sanshou 75 kg category.
