= Mohamad Kasem =

Syrian judoka (born 1993)

Personal information
- Nationality: Syrian
- Born: 3 October 1993 (age 32)

Sport
- Sport: Judo

Mohamad Kasem (Arabic: محمد قاسم; born 3 October 1993) is a Syrian judoka.

He competed at the 2016 Summer Olympics in Rio de Janeiro, in the men's 73 kg, where he was eliminated by An Chang-rim in the second round.
