= Thailand at the 2017 Asian Indoor and Martial Arts Games =

- Flag of Thailand
- IOC code: THA
- Medals: Gold 21 Silver 20 Bronze 29 Total 70

Asian Indoor and Martial Arts Games appearances
- 2005; 2007; 2009; 2013; 2017; 2021; 2025

Thailand competed at the 2017 Asian Indoor and Martial Arts Games held in Ashgabat, Turkmenistan.

== Medal summary ==
=== Medalists ===
Medal	Name	Sport	Event
Gold	Tamachan Momkoonthod; Varunya Wongteanchai	Tennis	Women's doubles
Gold	Nuttanon Kadchapanan; Nicha Lertpitaksinchai	Tennis	Mixed doubles
Gold	Kunsatri Kumsroi Suphawadee Kaeosrasaen	Ju-jitsu	Women's classic
Gold	Kunsatri Kumsroi Suphawadee Kaeosrasaen	Ju-jitsu	Women's show
Gold	Penphan Yothanan; Naruemol Banmoo; Supira Klanbut; Thidaporn Maihom	Basketball	Women's 3x3
Silver	Pratchaya Tepparak	Indoor athletics	Men's triple jump
Silver	Thammanun Pothaisong Warut Netpong	Ju-jitsu	Men's show
Silver	Ratcharat Yimprai Kunsatri Kumsroi	Ju-jitsu	Mixed classic
Bronze	Nuttanon Kadchapanan; Patcharapol Kawin	Tennis	Men's doubles
Bronze	Chompoothip Jundakate	Tennis	Women's singles
Bronze	Patcharin Cheapchandej	Tennis	Women's singles
Bronze	Jirayut Wuttiwannaphong Jirayu Vongsawan	Ju-jitsu	Men's classic
Bronze	Thammanun Pothaisong Suphawadee Kaeosrasaen	Ju-jitsu	Mixed show
