= Uzbekistan at the 2017 Asian Indoor and Martial Arts Games =

- IOC code: UZB
- NOC: National Olympic Committee of the Republic of Uzbekistan
- Website: www.olympic.uz (in Uzbek and English)

in Ashgabat September 17–27
- Competitors: 202 in 12 sports
- Medals Ranked 4th: Gold 21 Silver 28 Bronze 57 Total 106

Asian Indoor and Martial Arts Games appearances
- 2005; 2007; 2009; 2013; 2017; 2021; 2025

The Republic of Uzbekistan competed at the 2017 Asian Indoor and Martial Arts Games in Ashgabat, Turkmenistan, from 17 to 27 September 2017.

== Medalists ==
Medal	Name	Sport	Event	Date
Gold	Nadiya Dusanova	Boxing	Men's 49 kg	August 14
