= Iran at the 2017 Asian Indoor and Martial Arts Games =

- IOC code: IRI
- NOC: National Olympic Committee of the Islamic Republic of Iran

in Ashgabat
- Competitors: 207 in 20 sports
- Flag bearer: Sara Khademalsharieh
- Medals Ranked 3rd: Gold 36 Silver 23 Bronze 59 Total 118

Asian Indoor and Martial Arts Games appearances
- 2005; 2007; 2009; 2013; 2017; 2021; 2026

Iran participated at the 2017 Asian Indoor and Martial Arts Games in Ashgabat, Turkmenistan from 17 September to 27 September 2017.

== Competitors ==
Sport	Men	Women	Total
3x3 basketball		4	4
Alysh	8	10	18
Belt wrestling	12	9	21
Bowling	2		2
Chess	6	4	10
Cue sports	6	2	8
Cycling track	5	2	7
Equestrian	3		3
Futsal	14	14	28
Indoor athletics	8	1	9
Ju-jitsu	5	2	7
Kazakh kuresi	3		3
Kickboxing	9	4	13
Kurash	8	4	12
Muaythai	8	4	12
Pahlavani wrestling	3		3
Sambo	8		8
Short course swimming	8		8
Taekwondo	10	7	17
Tennis	2	2	4
Turkmen goresh	10	9	19
Weightlifting	5		5
Wrestling	16		16
Total	145	62	207

== Medal summary ==
=== Medals by sport ===
Sport	Gold	Silver	Bronze	Total
Alysh	1	1	10	12
Belt wrestling		1	8	9
Chess	1	1		2
Cue sports	1	2	2	5
Cycling track	1	1	1	3
Equestrian			1	1
Futsal	1		1	2
Indoor athletics	1	1	3	5
Ju-jitsu	1	2	2	5
Kickboxing	5	2	5	12
Kurash	1	3	5	9
Muaythai	3	2	3	8
Pahlavani wrestling	3			3
Sambo			3	3
Taekwondo	7	2	4	13
Turkmen goresh		1	5	6
Weightlifting	1	1	2	4
Wrestling	9	3	4	16
Total	36	23	59	118

=== Medalists ===
Medal	Name	Sport	Event
Gold	Zahra Yazdani	Alysh	Women's classic style 55 kg
Gold	Sara Khademalsharieh; Mobina Alinasab	Chess	Women's team blitz (U23)
Gold	Amir Sarkhosh; Hossein Vafaei; Soheil Vahedi	Cue sports	Men's snooker team
Gold	Ali Aliasgari; Mohammad Daneshvar; Ehsan Khademi; Mahmoud Parash	Cycling track	Men's team sprint
Gold	Sepehr Mohammadi; Alireza Samimi; Mohammad Shajari; Alireza Rafieipour; Hamid Ahmadi; Mohammad Reza Sangsefidi; Ali Asghar Hassanzadeh; Abolghasem Orouji; Saeid Ahmadabbasi; Hossein Tayyebi; Ahmad Esmaeilpour; Moslem Oladghobad; Farhad Tavakkoli; Mehdi Javid	Futsal	Men
Gold	Hassan Taftian	Indoor athletics	Men's 60 m
Gold	Masoud Jalilvand	Ju-jitsu	Men's ne-waza +94 kg
Gold	Mostafa Pourfaraj	Kickboxing	Men's point fighting 69 kg
Gold	Mohammad Pourfaraj	Kickboxing	Men's point fighting 79 kg
Gold	Omid Ahmadi Safa	Kickboxing	Men's low kick 51 kg
Gold	Mahmoud Sattari	Kickboxing	Men's low kick 81 kg
Gold	Shahnaz Mirheidari	Kickboxing	Women's point fighting 59 kg
Gold	Behzad Vahdani	Kurash	Men's 60 kg
Gold	Ali Zarinfar	Muaythai	Men's 60 kg
Gold	Keivan Soleimani	Muaythai	Men's 75 kg
Gold	Majid Hashembeigi	Muaythai	Men's 81 kg
Gold	Mohammad Naderi	Pahlavani wrestling	Men's 70 kg
Gold	Arashk Mohebbi	Pahlavani wrestling	Men's 90 kg
Gold	Ahmad Mirzapour	Pahlavani wrestling	Men's +90 kg
Gold	Mehdi Eshaghi	Taekwondo	Men's 54 kg
Gold	Soroush Ahmadi	Taekwondo	Men's 63 kg
Gold	Mehdi Jalali	Taekwondo	Men's 74 kg
Gold	Erfan Nazemi	Taekwondo	Men's 80 kg
Gold	Saeid Rajabi	Taekwondo	Men's 87 kg
Gold	Marjan Salahshouri	Taekwondo	Women's individual poomsae
Gold	Parisa Javadi	Taekwondo	Women's 62 kg
Gold	Sohrab Moradi	Weightlifting	Men's 94 kg
Gold	Iman Sadeghi	Wrestling	Men's freestyle 61 kg
Gold	Ezzatollah Akbari	Wrestling	Men's freestyle 86 kg
Gold	Mojtaba Goleij	Wrestling	Men's freestyle 97 kg
Gold	Farshad Belfakkeh	Wrestling	Men's Greco-Roman 71 kg
Gold	Pejman Poshtam	Wrestling	Men's Greco-Roman 75 kg
Gold	Mehdi Ebrahimi	Wrestling	Men's Greco-Roman 80 kg
Gold	Saman Azizi	Wrestling	Men's Greco-Roman 85 kg
Gold	Amir Hossein Hosseini	Wrestling	Men's Greco-Roman 98 kg
Gold	Behnam Mehdizadeh	Wrestling	Men's Greco-Roman 130 kg
Silver	Elaheh Rezaei	Alysh	Women's classic style 75 kg
Silver	Zahra Yazdani	Belt wrestling	Women's freestyle 55 kg
Silver	Alireza Firouzja; Parham Maghsoudloo	Chess	Men's team blitz (U23)
Silver	Hossein Vafaei	Cue sports	Men's snooker singles
Silver	Soheil Vahedi	Cue sports	Men's six-red snooker singles
Silver	Mohammad Daneshvar	Cycling track	Men's sprint
Silver	Keivan Ghanbarzadeh	Indoor athletics	Men's high jump
Silver	Masoud Hassanzadeh	Ju-jitsu	Men's ne-waza +94 kg
Silver	Masoud Hassanzadeh	Ju-jitsu	Men's ne-waza openweight
Silver	Hossein Karami	Kickboxing	Men's full contact 75 kg
Silver	Fatemeh Alizadeh	Kickboxing	Women's full contact 56 kg
Silver	Mojtaba Zamani	Kurash	Men's 90 kg
Silver	Mojtaba Nikbin	Kurash	Men's 100 kg
Silver	Kamran Rostami	Kurash	Men's +100 kg
Silver	Fatemeh Yavari	Muaythai	Women's 51 kg
Silver	Saeideh Ghaffari	Muaythai	Women's 60 kg
Silver	Kourosh Bakhtiar; Mohammad Sadegh Fotouhi; Ali Sohrabi	Taekwondo	Men's team poomsae
Silver	Hadi Tiran	Taekwondo	Men's 58 kg
Silver	Hamed Mirzapour	Turkmen goresh	Men's classic style 90 kg
Silver	Ali Hashemi	Weightlifting	Men's 105 kg
Silver	Hossein Eliasi	Wrestling	Men's freestyle 74 kg
Silver	Mohsen Hajipour	Wrestling	Men's Greco-Roman 59 kg
Silver	Amin Souri	Wrestling	Men's Greco-Roman 66 kg
Bronze	Abdollah Eiri	Alysh	Men's freestyle 100 kg
Bronze	Mohammad Gholami	Alysh	Men's classic style 70 kg
Bronze	Mahmoud Parvaneh	Alysh	Men's classic style 100 kg
Bronze	Abdolvahed Mohammadi	Alysh	Men's classic style +100 kg
Bronze	Leila Salarvand	Alysh	Women's freestyle 65 kg
Bronze	Maryam Ahmadi	Alysh	Women's freestyle 75 kg
Bronze	Saeideh Rahimi	Alysh	Women's freestyle +75 kg
Bronze	Reihaneh Sheikhian	Alysh	Women's classic style 60 kg
Bronze	Sahar Ghanizadeh	Alysh	Women's classic style 65 kg
Bronze	Asieh Shojaei	Alysh	Women's classic style +75 kg
Bronze	Yaser Mohammadi	Belt wrestling	Men's freestyle 80 kg
Bronze	Davoud Avazzadeh	Belt wrestling	Men's freestyle 90 kg
Bronze	Yaser Mohammadi	Belt wrestling	Men's classic style 80 kg
Bronze	Zahra Mahmoudi	Belt wrestling	Women's freestyle 60 kg
Bronze	Zahra Majdi	Belt wrestling	Women's freestyle 70 kg
Bronze	Saeideh Rahimi	Belt wrestling	Women's freestyle +70 kg
Bronze	Leila Siahvashi	Belt wrestling	Women's classic style 50 kg
Bronze	Asieh Shojaei	Belt wrestling	Women's classic style +70 kg
Bronze	Mohammad Ali Pordel; Mehdi Rasekhi	Cue sports	Men's nine-ball doubles
Bronze	Soheil Vahedi	Cue sports	Men's snooker singles
Bronze	Mohammad Daneshvar	Cycling track	Men's keirin
Bronze	Davoud Pourrezaei	Equestrian	Open individual jumping
Bronze	Farzaneh Tavassoli; Tahereh Mehdipour; Leila Khodabandehloo; Fatemeh Arjangi; Sara Shirbeigi; Fereshteh Khosravi; Fereshteh Karimi; Fatemeh Papi; Soheila Malmoli; Nasimeh Gholami; Nastaran Moghimi; Fahimeh Zareei; Fatemeh Etedadi; Arezoo Sadaghianizadeh	Futsal	Women
Bronze	Reza Ghasemi	Indoor athletics	Men's 60 m
Bronze	Amir Moradi	Indoor athletics	Men's 800 m
Bronze	Hossein Keyhani	Indoor athletics	Men's 3000 m
Bronze	Masoud Jalilvand	Ju-jitsu	Men's ne-waza openweight
Bronze	Soudeh Kamandani	Ju-jitsu	Women's ne-waza +70 kg
Bronze	Davoud Mousavi	Kickboxing	Men's kick light 74 kg
Bronze	Hamid Amni	Kickboxing	Men's full contact 67 kg
Bronze	Iraj Moradi	Kickboxing	Men's low kick 63.5 kg
Bronze	Ali Baniasad	Kickboxing	Men's low kick 71 kg
Bronze	Zeinab Jabbari	Kickboxing	Women's kick light 60 kg
Bronze	Ghanbar Ali Ghanbari	Kurash	Men's 66 kg
Bronze	Omid Tiztak	Kurash	Men's 73 kg
Bronze	Elias Aliakbari	Kurash	Men's 81 kg
Bronze	Shayan Kheirandish	Kurash	Men's 90 kg
Bronze	Zahra Bagheri	Kurash	Women's 87 kg
Bronze	Amir Hossein Kamari	Muaythai	Men's 54 kg
Bronze	Reza Ahmadnejad	Muaythai	Men's 67 kg
Bronze	Zahra Bourbour	Muaythai	Women's 63.5 kg
Bronze	Mohammad Reza Saeidi	Sambo	Men's sport 68 kg
Bronze	Iraj Amirkhani	Sambo	Men's sport 90 kg
Bronze	Milad Shiri	Sambo	Men's combat +100 kg
Bronze	Kourosh Bakhtiar	Taekwondo	Men's individual poomsae
Bronze	Marjan Salahshouri; Narges Minakhani; Mahsa Sadeghi	Taekwondo	Women's team poomsae
Bronze	Fatemeh Maddahi	Taekwondo	Women's 46 kg
Bronze	Tayyebeh Parsa	Taekwondo	Women's 57 kg
Bronze	Esmaeil Amiri	Turkmen goresh	Men's freestyle 68 kg
Bronze	Ghasem Dazi	Turkmen goresh	Men's freestyle 75 kg
Bronze	Habibollah Torabi	Turkmen goresh	Men's freestyle 82 kg
Bronze	Leila Siahvashi	Turkmen goresh	Women's classic style 52 kg
Bronze	Reihaneh Sheikhian	Turkmen goresh	Women's classic style 58 kg
Bronze	Ali Miri	Weightlifting	Men's 85 kg
Bronze	Homayoun Teymouri	Weightlifting	Men's +105 kg
Bronze	Nader Hajiaghania	Wrestling	Men's freestyle 57 kg
Bronze	Farzad Amouzad	Wrestling	Men's freestyle 65 kg
Bronze	Saeid Dadashpour	Wrestling	Men's freestyle 70 kg
Bronze	Yadollah Mohebbi	Wrestling	Men's freestyle 125 kg

== Results by event ==
=== 3x3 basketball ===
Athlete	Event	Preliminary round			Quarterfinal	Semifinal	Final	Rank
Athlete	Event	Round 1	Round 2	Rank	Quarterfinal	Semifinal	Final	Rank
Delaram Vakili; Rojano Mahmoudi; Gelareh Kakavanpour; Aireian Artounian	Women	Afghanistan; W 21–4	Chinese Taipei; W 16–15	1 Q	Turkmenistan; L 7–14	Did not advance		5

=== Belt wrestling ===
==== Alysh ====
Freestyle

Athlete	Event	Round of 16	Quarterfinal	Semifinal	Final	Rank
Mohammad Gholami	Men's 70 kg	Medow (TKM); L Fall	Did not advance			9
Hadi Salimi	Men's 80 kg	Rajabzoda (TJK); L 1–4	Did not advance			9
Davoud Avazzadeh	Men's 90 kg	Mavlonov (UZB); L Fall	Did not advance			9
Abdollah Eiri	Men's 100 kg	Bye	Karimi (AFG); W 6–1	Batyrow (TKM); L Fall	Did not advance	3rd place, bronze medalist(s)
Abdolvahed Mohammadi	Men's +100 kg	Sudrajat (INA); W Fall	Mirov (TJK); L Fall	Did not advance		5
Zahra Yazdani	Women's 55 kg	Rahmaniah (INA); L Fall	Did not advance			9
Zahra Mahmoudi	Women's 60 kg	—N/a	Abdyrahmanowa (TKM); L Fall	Did not advance		5
Leila Salarvand	Women's 65 kg	Round robin Attokur Kyzy (KGZ); W 6–2	Round robin Hallyýewa (TKM); L Fall	Round robin Haýytbaýewa (TKM); L Fall	Round robin Mamadjonova (UZB); W DSQ	3rd place, bronze medalist(s)
Zahra Majdi	Women's 70 kg	Ismatova (UZB); L Fall	Did not advance			9
Maryam Ahmadi	Women's 75 kg	—N/a	Bye	Surkiýewa (TKM); L Fall	Did not advance	3rd place, bronze medalist(s)
Saeideh Rahimi	Women's +75 kg	—N/a	Durnazarowa (TKM); W Fall	Mönkhtsetseg (MGL); L 0–6	Did not advance	3rd place, bronze medalist(s)

Classic style

Athlete	Event	Round of 16	Quarterfinal	Semifinal	Final	Rank
Ghasem Norouzi	Men's 60 kg	Bye	Ummatov (UZB); L 3–6	Did not advance		5
Mohammad Gholami	Men's 70 kg	Bye	Taganow (TKM); W 2–1	Mashrabov (UZB); L 1–7	Did not advance	3rd place, bronze medalist(s)
Hadi Salimi	Men's 80 kg	Sakhizada (AFG); W 1–0	Kudaiberdiev (KGZ); L 0–2	Did not advance		5
Hamed Mirzapour	Men's 90 kg	Amanilla Uulu (KGZ); L 1–7	Did not advance			9
Mahmoud Parvaneh	Men's 100 kg	Bye	Ghule (IND); W WO	Kuldashev (UZB); L 0–0	Did not advance	3rd place, bronze medalist(s)
Abdolvahed Mohammadi	Men's +100 kg	Bye	Pürevbaatar (MGL); W 5–0	Atamämmedow (TKM); L 0–6	Did not advance	3rd place, bronze medalist(s)
Zahra Yazdani	Women's 55 kg	Bye	Loberanes (PHI); W Fall	Badaglyýewa (TKM); W Fall	Muydinova (UZB); W Fall	1st place, gold medalist(s)
Reihaneh Sheikhian	Women's 60 kg	—N/a	Tener (PHI); W 7–0	Madraimowa (TKM); L Fall	Did not advance	3rd place, bronze medalist(s)
Sahar Ghanizadeh	Women's 65 kg	Round robin Jurakuzieva (UZB); W 6–0	Round robin Mamadjonova (UZB); L 0–6	Round robin Hallyýewa (TKM); L 0–4	Round robin Alibai Kyzy (KGZ); W 3–2	3rd place, bronze medalist(s)
Elaheh Rezaei	Women's 75 kg	—N/a	Bye	Parhar (IND); W Fall	Mamarasul Kyzy (KGZ); L 1–1	2nd place, silver medalist(s)
Asieh Shojaei	Women's +75 kg	—N/a	Sheralieva (UZB); W Fall	Durnazarowa (TKM); L Fall	Did not advance	3rd place, bronze medalist(s)

==== Belt wrestling ====
Freestyle

Athlete	Event	Round of 16	Quarterfinal	Semifinal	Final	Rank
Ali Khalili	Men's 55 kg	Shahid (PAK); L Fall	Did not advance			9
Ghasem Norouzi	Men's 60 kg	Bye	Aşyrgeldiýew (TKM); L Fall	Did not advance		12
Nasser Ghorbanpour	Men's 65 kg	Sotvoldiev (UZB); L Fall	Did not advance			10
Mohammad Gholami	Men's 70 kg	Ruziev (UZB); L 0–7	Did not advance			12
Yaser Mohammadi	Men's 80 kg	Berdiýew (TKM); W Fall	Makhkamov (UZB); W Fall	Tavaldiev (KGZ); L 5–7	Did not advance	3rd place, bronze medalist(s)
Davoud Avazzadeh	Men's 90 kg	Hofmann (PHI); W Fall	Adnan (PAK); W Fall	Ybraýymgulyýew (TKM); L Fall	Did not advance	3rd place, bronze medalist(s)
Abdollah Eiri	Men's 100 kg	Kelsinbekov (KGZ); L Fall	Did not advance			11
Abdolvahed Mohammadi	Men's +100 kg	Nishanov (KGZ); L 0–1	Did not advance			8
Leila Siahvashi	Women's 50 kg	Ergasheva (UZB); L 0–6	Did not advance			9
Zahra Yazdani	Women's 55 kg	Inatyllaýewa (TKM); W Fall	Dyussembayeva (KAZ); W Fall	Dadaboeva (UZB); W 4–4	Abdyrahmanowa (TKM); L 2–7	2nd place, silver medalist(s)
Zahra Mahmoudi	Women's 60 kg	Round robin Taşpulatowa (TKM); L 1–3	Round robin Madraimowa (TKM); L Fall	Round robin Momunova (KGZ); W Fall	Round robin Tener (PHI); W Fall	3rd place, bronze medalist(s)
Leila Salarvand	Women's 65 kg	—N/a	Mamadjonova (UZB); L Fall	Did not advance		6
Zahra Majdi	Women's 70 kg	Bye	Ismatova (UZB); W 6–4	Zhakypbekova (KAZ); L 0–7	Did not advance	3rd place, bronze medalist(s)
Saeideh Rahimi	Women's +70 kg	Sheralieva (UZB); W 3–2	Muhammedowa (TKM); W 3–0	Mamarasul Kyzy (KGZ); L 0–6	Did not advance	3rd place, bronze medalist(s)

Classic style

Athlete	Event	Round of 16	Quarterfinal	Semifinal	Final	Rank
Ali Khalili	Men's 55 kg	Bye	Jumaýew (TKM); L Fall	Did not advance		9
Ghasem Norouzi	Men's 60 kg	Ummatov (UZB); L Fall	Did not advance			12
Esmaeil Amiri	Men's 65 kg	—N/a	Orazsähedow (TKM); L 3–6	Did not advance		5
Mohammad Gholami	Men's 70 kg	Kurbankulov (KAZ); W 7–0	Ruziev (UZB); L Fall	Did not advance		6
Yaser Mohammadi	Men's 80 kg	Bye	Drigh (PAK); W 7–0	Nematov (UZB); L 1–6	Did not advance	3rd place, bronze medalist(s)
Hamed Mirzapour	Men's 90 kg	Muzapparov (KAZ); L 0–6	Did not advance			9
Mahmoud Parvaneh	Men's 100 kg	Batbold (MGL); W 3–0	Kuldashev (UZB); L 0–4	Did not advance		5
Habib Gholampour	Men's +100 kg	Bye	Suyunov (UZB); L 0–4	Did not advance		9
Leila Siahvashi	Women's 50 kg	Bye	Jagtap (IND); W Fall	Ergasheva (UZB); L 1–3	Did not advance	3rd place, bronze medalist(s)
Zahra Yazdani	Women's 55 kg	—N/a	Abdyrahmanowa (TKM); L Fall	Did not advance		6
Reihaneh Sheikhian	Women's 60 kg	Round robin Momunova (KGZ); L Fall	Round robin Taşpulatowa (TKM); L 0–6	Round robin Madraimowa (TKM); L Fall	Round robin Tener (PHI); L Fall	5
Sahar Ghanizadeh	Women's 65 kg	—N/a	Mamadjonova (UZB); L Fall	Did not advance		6
Asieh Shojaei	Women's +70 kg	Bye	Parhar (IND); W Fall	Muhammedowa (TKM); L 1–1	Did not advance	3rd place, bronze medalist(s)

==== Kazakh kuresi ====
Athlete	Event	Round of 16	Quarterfinal	Semifinal	Final	Rank
Omid Khedmati	Men's 70 kg	Bye	Ataýew (TKM); L 0001–0012	Did not advance	3rd place match Eraliev (KGZ); L 0100–1100	5
Ali Mehdizadeh	Men's 90 kg	Bye	Tejenow (TKM); L 0001–1002	Did not advance	3rd place match Istibayev (KAZ); L 0000–1001	5
Saeid Ghasemi	Men's +90 kg	Nuryýew (TKM); L 0011–0111	Did not advance			9

==== Pahlavani ====
Athlete	Event	Round of 16	Quarterfinal	Semifinal	Final	Rank
Mohammad Naderi	Men's 70 kg	Sükhbat (MGL); W Fall	Riyatna (INA); W Fall	Abbas (PAK); W Fall	Omarow (TKM); W 4–4	1st place, gold medalist(s)
Arashk Mohebbi	Men's 90 kg	Meredow (TKM); W Fall	Dustow (TKM); W 10–0	Kristian (INA); W Fall	Adnan (PAK); W Fall	1st place, gold medalist(s)
Ahmad Mirzapour	Men's +90 kg	Bye	Batbold (MGL); W Fall	Altangerel (MGL); W Fall	Anakulov (TJK); W Fall	1st place, gold medalist(s)

=== Bowling ===
Athlete	Event	Preliminary		Knockout round			
Athlete	Event	Score	Rank	Quarterfinal	Semifinal	Final	Rank
Bagher Ahmadi	Men's singles	DNF	—	Did not advance			
Ebrahim Oushani	Men's singles	1120	52	Did not advance			
Bagher Ahmadi; Ebrahim Oushani	Men's doubles	2155	30	Did not advance			

=== Chess ===
Individual standard

Athlete	Event	Swiss round							Rank
Athlete	Event	Round 1	Round 2	Round 3	Round 4	Round 5	Round 6	Round 7	Rank
Pouya Idani	Men	Kulpruethanon (THA); W 1–0	Hossain (BAN); L 0–1	Al-Khatib (JOR); W 1–0	Ali (INA); W 1–0	Ganguly (IND); W 1–0	Đào (VIE); D ½–½	Lê (VIE); D ½–½	6
Parham Maghsoudloo	Men	Najjar (LBN); W 1–0	Wynn (MYA); W 1–0	Lê (VIE); L 0–1	Nezad (QAT); D ½–½	Markov (KGZ); D ½–½	Ödäýew (TKM); D ½–½	Priasmoro (INA); D ½–½	14
Mitra Hejazipour	Women	Khamboo (NEP); W WO	Saduakassova (KAZ); D ½–½	Tokhirjonova (UZB); L 0–1	Gong (SGP); L 0–1	Hotami (TJK); W 1–0	Samaganova (KGZ); W 1–0	Geldiýewa (TKM); W 1–0	10
Sara Khademalsharieh	Women	Antonova (TJK); W 1–0	Tokhirjonova (UZB); D ½–½	Sachdev (IND); D ½–½	Nodirjanova (UZB); D ½–½	Hallaýewa (TKM); W 1–0	Lei (CHN); D ½–½	Vijayalakshmi (IND); L 0–1	13

Team

Athlete	Event	Swiss round						Semifinal	Final	Rank
Athlete	Event	Round 1	Round 2	Round 3	Round 4	Round 5	Rank	Semifinal	Final	Rank
Ehsan Ghaemmaghami; Amir Reza Pourramezanali	Men's blitz	Thailand; W 2–0	China; L ½–1½	Philippines; D 1–1	Kazakhstan; D 1–1	Uzbekistan; D 1–1	8	Did not advance		8
Ehsan Ghaemmaghami; Pouya Idani	Men's rapid	United Arab Emirates; W 1½–½	Turkmenistan; D 1–1	Indonesia; W 1½–½	India; D 1–1	Qatar; L ½–1½	7	Did not advance		7
Alireza Firouzja; Parham Maghsoudloo	Men's blitz (U23)	Vietnam; W 2–0	Kazakhstan; L ½–1½	Uzbekistan; W 2–0	Philippines; D 1–1	Turkmenistan; W 2–0	2 Q	India; W 1½–½	China; L ½–1½	2nd place, silver medalist(s)
Parham Maghsoudloo; Masoud Mosaddeghpour	Men's rapid (U23)	Jordan; D 1–1	Tajikistan; W 2–0	China; D 1–1	India; L 0–2	Uzbekistan; D 1–1	6	Did not advance		6
Atousa Pourkashian; Mitra Hejazipour	Women's blitz	Kyrgyzstan; W 1½–½	Indonesia; D 1–1	Turkmenistan; D 1–1	Uzbekistan; W 1½–½	China; L 0–2	5	Did not advance		5
Atousa Pourkashian; Mitra Hejazipour	Women's rapid	Tajikistan; W 2–0	China; L ½–1½	Kazakhstan; D 1–1	India; L ½–1½	Uzbekistan; W 1½–½	5	Did not advance		5
Sara Khademalsharieh; Mobina Alinasab	Women's blitz (U23)	Turkmenistan; D 1–1	Indonesia; L 0–2	United Arab Emirates; W 2–0	Sri Lanka; W 2–0	China; D 1–1	4 Q	Kazakhstan; W 1–1	China; W 1–1 (1–0)	1st place, gold medalist(s)
Sara Khademalsharieh; Mobina Alinasab	Women's rapid (U23)	United Arab Emirates; W 2–0	Uzbekistan; W 1½–½	China; L ½–1½	Kazakhstan; L 0–2	Indonesia; W 1½–½	6	Did not advance		6

=== Cue sports ===
Athlete	Event	Round of 64	Round of 32	Round of 16	Quarterfinal	Semifinal	Final	Rank
Amir Sarkhosh	Men's English billiards	—N/a	Bye	Ilamanow (TKM); W 3–0	Trần (VIE); L 1–3	Did not advance		5
Soheil Vahedi	Men's English billiards	—N/a	Kothari (IND); L 1–3	Did not advance				17
Ali Maghsoud	Men's nine-ball	Bye	Kalenbaev (KGZ); W 9–1	Berjaoui (LBN); W 9–2	Makkamontree (THA); L 6–9	Did not advance		5
Mohammad Ali Pordel	Men's nine-ball	Bye	Lo (HKG); L 8–9	Did not advance				17
Mohammad Ali Pordel; Mehdi Rasekhi	Men's nine-ball doubles	—N/a		Fayaz and Mohamed (MDV); W 9–2	Salem and Hussein (UAE); W 9–3	Ko and Cheng (TPE); L 3–9	Did not advance	3rd place, bronze medalist(s)
Hossein Vafaei	Men's snooker	—N/a	Ilamanow (TKM); W 4–0	Kachaiwong (THA); W 4–0	Mohammad (AFG); W 4–2	Zhou (CHN); W 4–3	Zhao (CHN); L 2–4	2nd place, silver medalist(s)
Soheil Vahedi	Men's snooker	—N/a	Cheung (HKG); W 4–0	Lee (KOR); W 4–3	Chawla (IND); W 4–3	Zhao (CHN); L 2–4	Did not advance	3rd place, bronze medalist(s)
Amir Sarkhosh; Hossein Vafaei; Soheil Vahedi	Men's snooker team	—N/a		South Korea; W 3–0	India; W 3–2	Afghanistan; W 3–1	Qatar; W 3–0	1st place, gold medalist(s)
Amir Sarkhosh	Men's six-red snooker	—N/a	Lin (HKG); L 0–5	Did not advance				17
Soheil Vahedi	Men's six-red snooker	—N/a	Bye	Bilal (PAK); W 5–1	Lü (CHN); W 5–1	Mohammad (AFG); W 5–2	Yan (CHN); L 1–5	2nd place, silver medalist(s)
Parisa Mangli	Women's nine-ball	—N/a		Han (CHN); L 1–7	Did not advance			9
Akram Mohammadi	Women's nine-ball	—N/a		Chen (TPE); L 1–7	Did not advance			9
Parisa Mangli	Women's ten-ball	—N/a		Azra (MDV); W 7–3	Amit (PHI); L 1–7	Did not advance		5
Akram Mohammadi	Women's ten-ball	—N/a		Kim (KOR); L 1–7	Did not advance			9
Akram Mohammadi	Women's six-red snooker	—N/a		Wan (HKG); L 1–4	Did not advance			9

=== Cycling track ===
Sprint

Athlete	Event	Qualifying		Round of 32	Round of 32 Repechage	Round of 16	Round of 16 Repechage	Quarterfinal	Semifinal	Final	Rank
Athlete	Event	Time	Rank	Round of 32	Round of 32 Repechage	Round of 16	Round of 16 Repechage	Quarterfinal	Semifinal	Final	Rank
Ali Aliasgari	Men's sprint	10.560	4 Q	Al-Mansoori (UAE); W 1–0	Bye	Leung (HKG); W 1–0	Bye	Tapimay (THA); W 2–1	Daneshvar (IRI); L 0–2	Ponomaryov (KAZ); L 0–2	4
Mohammad Daneshvar	Men's sprint	10.164	1 Q	Gaýypow (TKM); W 1–0	Bye	Kumar (IND); W 1–0	Bye	Law (HKG); W 2–0	Aliasgari (IRI); W 2–0	Vorzhev (KAZ); L 0–2	2nd place, silver medalist(s)
Fatemeh Hadavand	Women's sprint	12.599	8 Q	—N/a				Lee (HKG); L 0–2	Did not advance		8

Keirin

Athlete	Event	Round 1	Repechage	Round 2	Final	Rank
Athlete	Event	Rank	Rank	Rank	Rank	Rank
Mohammad Daneshvar	Men's keirin	1 Q	Bye	1 QA	3	3rd place, bronze medalist(s)
Mahmoud Parash	Men's keirin	2 Q	Bye	2 QA	4	4
Fatemeh Hadavand	Women's keirin	3 QA	—N/a		5	5

Endurance

Athlete	Event	Scratch race		Tempo race		Elimination race		Points race		Total	Rank
Athlete	Event	Rank	Points	Rank	Points	Rank	Points	Rank	Points	Total	Rank
Mohammad Ganjkhanloo	Men's omnium	7	28	5	32	6	30	2	32	122	4
Parastoo Basti	Women's omnium	6	30	6	30	5	32	5	10	102	6
Fatemeh Hadavand	Women's omnium	9	24	9	24	8	26	DNS		DNF	—

Team

Athlete	Event	Qualifying		Round 1		Final	Rank
Athlete	Event	Time	Rank	Time	Rank	Final	Rank
Ali Aliasgari; Mohammad Daneshvar; Ehsan Khademi; Mahmoud Parash (heats)	Men's team sprint	46.758	2 Q	United Arab Emirates; W 45.245–49.917	1 Q	Kazakhstan; W 45.535–45.588	1st place, gold medalist(s)
Parastoo Basti; Fatemeh Hadavand	Women's team sprint	39.783	6 Q	Thailand; L 40.043–36.249	6	Did not advance	6

=== Equestrian ===
Athlete	Event	Qualifier					Final		Jump-off		Rank
Athlete	Event	1st	2nd	3rd	Total	Rank	Pen.	Time	Pen.	Time	Rank
Davoud Pourrezaei on Akylly	Individual jumping (Akhal-Teke)	—N/a					8	60.69	—N/a		6
Amir Hossein Habibi on Annaloma	Individual jumping	4	1	6	11	11 Q	8	69.20	Not needed		10
Davoud Pourrezaei on Veliciano	Individual jumping	4	EL	4	60	19 Q	0	QJ	0	41.86	3rd place, bronze medalist(s)
Ali Rahmati on Quo Vadis	Individual jumping	5	4	EL	EL	—	Did not advance				21
Amir Hossein Habibi on Annaloma; Ali Rahmati on Quo Vadis; Davoud Pourrezaei on Veliciano	Team jumping	13	EL	—N/a	EL	—	—N/a				

=== Futsal ===
Team	Event	Preliminary round				Quarterfinal	Semifinal	Final	Rank
Team	Event	Round 1	Round 2	Round 3	Rank	Quarterfinal	Semifinal	Final	Rank
Iran	Men	Tahiti; W 16–1	Jordan; W 7–3	Kyrgyzstan; W 10–0	1 Q	Thailand; W 10–4	Afghanistan; W 8–2	Uzbekistan; W 7–1	1st place, gold medalist(s)
Iran	Women	Palestine; W 16–1	Thailand; L 0–2	—N/a	2 Q	—N/a	Japan; L 0–2	3rd place match China; W 5–1	3rd place, bronze medalist(s)
Roster – Men: Sepehr Mohammadi; Alireza Samimi; Mohammad Shajari; Alireza Rafieipour; Hamid Ahmadi; Mohammad Reza Sangsefidi; Ali Asghar Hassanzadeh; Abolghasem Orouji; Saeid Ahmadabbasi; Hossein Tayyebi; Ahmad Esmaeilpour; Moslem Oladghobad; Farhad Tavakkoli; Mehdi Javid; Coach: Mohammad Nazemalsharieh Roster – Women: Farzaneh Tavassoli; Tahereh Mehdipour; Leila Khodabandehloo; Fatemeh Arjangi; Sara Shirbeigi; Fereshteh Khosravi; Fereshteh Karimi; Fatemeh Papi; Soheila Malmoli; Nasimeh Gholami; Nastaran Moghimi; Fahimeh Zareei; Fatemeh Etedadi; Arezoo Sadaghianizadeh; Coach: Shahrzad Mozaffar

=== Indoor athletics ===
Track & Field

Athlete	Event	Round 1		Semifinal		Final	Rank
Athlete	Event	Time	Rank	Time	Rank	Time / Result	Rank
Reza Ghasemi	Men's 60 m	6.85	2 Q	6.72	1 Q	6.64	3rd place, bronze medalist(s)
Hassan Taftian	Men's 60 m	6.99	1 Q	6.71	2 Q	6.55	1st place, gold medalist(s)
Ali Khadivar	Men's 400 m	48.66	1 Q	48.51	2 Q	47.04	4
Amir Moradi	Men's 800 m	1:54.43	1 Q	1:51.47	1 Q	1:49.51	3rd place, bronze medalist(s)
Moslem Niadoust	Men's 1500 m	3:58.23	1 Q	—N/a		3:58.65	6
Hossein Keyhani	Men's 3000 m	8:30.24	3 Q	—N/a		8:07.09	3rd place, bronze medalist(s)
Keivan Ghanbarzadeh	Men's high jump	—N/a				2.26 m	2nd place, silver medalist(s)
Ali Samari	Men's shot put	—N/a				17.26 m	9

Combined

Athlete	Event	60mH	HJ	SP	LJ	800m	Total	Rank
Sepideh Tavakkoli	Women's pentathlon	9.42; 824	1.78 m 953	11.75 m 645	5.23 m 623	2:33.69; 647	3547	5

=== Ju-jitsu ===
Athlete	Event	Round of 32	Round of 16	Quarterfinal	Semifinal	Final	Rank
Mohammad Mansouri Davar	Men's contact 77 kg	—N/a		Yespolov (KAZ); L DSQ	Did not advance		5
Amir Hossein Khademian	Men's ne-waza 69 kg	Bye	Mirlanov (KGZ); L 2–2	Did not advance			9
Mohammad Mansouri Davar	Men's ne-waza 77 kg	Bye	Atajanow (TKM); W 4–0	Mehrdil (AFG); W SUB	Munfaredi (BRN); L SUB	3rd place match Al-Hammadi (UAE); L 3–6	5
Mohsen Hamidi	Men's ne-waza 94 kg	—N/a	Atajanow (TKM); L 0–4	Did not advance			9
Masoud Hassanzadeh	Men's ne-waza +94 kg	—N/a	Netthip (THA); W 2–0	Tejenow (TKM); W SUB	Fadel (LBN); W SUB	Jalilvand (IRI); L 2–2	2nd place, silver medalist(s)
Masoud Jalilvand	Men's ne-waza +94 kg	—N/a	Baj (JOR); W 0–0	Ali (PAK); W 2–0	Izbasarow (TKM); W 2–0	Hassanzadeh (IRI); W 2–2	1st place, gold medalist(s)
Masoud Hassanzadeh	Men's ne-waza openweight	—N/a	Al-Rasheed (JOR); W SUB	Tejenow (TKM); W DSQ	Al-Hammadi (UAE); W 2–2	Al-Ketbi (UAE); L DSQ	2nd place, silver medalist(s)
Masoud Jalilvand	Men's ne-waza openweight	—N/a	Bye		Al-Ketbi (UAE); L 0–0	Did not advance	3rd place, bronze medalist(s)
Nasim Mohammadi	Women's ne-waza 62 kg	—N/a	Al-Shamsi (UAE); W 3–0	Senatham (THA); L SUB	Repechage; Öwezgeldiýewa (TKM); L 0–3	Did not advance	7
Soudeh Kamandani	Women's ne-waza +70 kg	—N/a	Bye	Al-Ali (UAE); W 2–0	Agajanowa (TKM); L 0–6	3rd place match Kanwal (PAK); W 2–0	3rd place, bronze medalist(s)
Soudeh Kamandani	Women's ne-waza openweight	—N/a	Sugar (MGL); L WO	Did not advance			9

=== Kickboxing ===
Tatami

Athlete	Event	Round of 16	Quarterfinal	Semifinal	Final	Rank
Mostafa Pourfaraj	Men's kick light 69 kg	Habeeb (IRQ); L 0–2	Did not advance			9
Davoud Mousavi	Men's kick light 74 kg	Bye	Alibekov (UZB); W 3–0	Geldimämmedow (TKM); L 1–2	Did not advance	3rd place, bronze medalist(s)
Mostafa Pourfaraj	Men's point fighting 69 kg	Bye	Akhmedov (TJK); W 9–6	Kalbaev (KGZ); W 7–4	Mohammed (IRQ); W 11–2	1st place, gold medalist(s)
Mohammad Pourfaraj	Men's point fighting 79 kg	Bye	Satlykgulyýew (TKM); W 12–9	Tyuryaev (TJK); W 6–4	Khusanov (UZB); W 15–5	1st place, gold medalist(s)
Zeinab Jabbari	Women's kick light 60 kg	—N/a	Khamzina (KAZ); W 3–0	Samadova (TJK); L 1–2	Did not advance	3rd place, bronze medalist(s)
Shahnaz Mirheidari	Women's kick light 60 kg	—N/a	Tseng (TPE); L 1–2	Did not advance		5
Shahnaz Mirheidari	Women's point fighting 59 kg	—N/a	Bye	Kholova (TJK); W 10–0	Gupbykowa (TKM); W 10–0	1st place, gold medalist(s)

Ring

Athlete	Event	Round of 16	Quarterfinal	Semifinal	Final	Rank
Hamid Amni	Men's full contact 67 kg	Bye	Kosimov (TJK); W 3–0	Amanow (TKM); L 0–3	Did not advance	3rd place, bronze medalist(s)
Hossein Karami	Men's full contact 75 kg	—N/a	Kudaiberdiev (KGZ); W 3–0	Khan (PAK); W 3–0	Lateef (IRQ); L 1–2	2nd place, silver medalist(s)
Omid Ahmadi Safa	Men's low kick 51 kg	Bye	Hussaini (AFG); W DSQ	Abughazleh (JOR); W KO	Sabih (IRQ); W 2–1	1st place, gold medalist(s)
Iraj Moradi	Men's low kick 63.5 kg	Bye	Ataýew (TKM); W RET	Fedoseev (KGZ); L 0–3	Did not advance	3rd place, bronze medalist(s)
Ali Baniasad	Men's low kick 71 kg	Bye	Ghassan (JOR); W 3–0	Jumanyýazow (TKM); L 0–3	Did not advance	3rd place, bronze medalist(s)
Mahmoud Sattari	Men's low kick 81 kg	Bye	Jumakulyýew (TKM); W KO	Salama (JOR); W 3–0	Elboev (UZB); W 3–0	1st place, gold medalist(s)
Fatemeh Alizadeh	Women's full contact 56 kg	—N/a	Samadova (TJK); W WO	Borisova (KGZ); W 2–0	Nauryzbayeva (KAZ); L 1–2	2nd place, silver medalist(s)
Atefeh Balinparast	Women's low kick 52 kg	Bye	Möngöngerel (MGL); L 0–3	Did not advance		5

=== Kurash ===
Athlete	Event	Round of 32	Round of 16	Quarterfinal	Semifinal	Final	Rank
Behzad Vahdani	Men's 60 kg	—N/a	Bye	Ghusn (SYR); W 101–000	Hallyýew (TKM); W 011–001	Omurzakow (TKM); W 013–001	1st place, gold medalist(s)
Ghanbar Ali Ghanbari	Men's 66 kg	—N/a	Khalimov (TJK); W 010–000	Gahlot (IND); W 004–000	Allaberdiýew (TKM); L 000–003	Did not advance	3rd place, bronze medalist(s)
Omid Tiztak	Men's 73 kg	Falah (IRQ); W 100–000	Partap (IND); W 102–000	Bigzada (AFG); W 110–000	Abraev (UZB); L 000–101	Did not advance	3rd place, bronze medalist(s)
Elias Aliakbari	Men's 81 kg	—N/a	Bùi (VIE); W 101–001	Malikyar (AFG); W 101–001	Huang (TPE); L 010–010	Did not advance	3rd place, bronze medalist(s)
Shayan Kheirandish	Men's 90 kg	—N/a	Al-Najdi (IOA); W WO	Senales (PHI); W 101–000	Arslanov (UZB); L 000–002	Did not advance	3rd place, bronze medalist(s)
Mojtaba Zamani	Men's 90 kg	—N/a	Hojakuliýew (TKM); W 101–000	Ishaqzai (AFG); W 011–000	Al-Taweel (IOA); W 112–001	Arslanov (UZB); L 012–101	2nd place, silver medalist(s)
Mojtaba Nikbin	Men's 100 kg	—N/a	Sharma (IND); W WO	Saidov (TJK); W WO	Begaliýew (TKM); W 001–000	Juraev (UZB); L 000–001	2nd place, silver medalist(s)
Kamran Rostami	Men's +100 kg	—N/a	Bye	Abdurakhmonov (TJK); W WO	Omarkhil (AFG); W 100–000	Khisomiddinov (UZB); L 001–011	2nd place, silver medalist(s)
Zahra Naderi	Women's 63 kg	—N/a	Nguyễn (VIE); L 001–011	Did not advance			9
Raheleh Asghari	Women's 70 kg	—N/a	Khudaykulova (UZB); L 000–011	Did not advance			9
Mahboubeh Bidel	Women's 70 kg	—N/a	Bye	Yang (TPE); L 000–101	Did not advance		5
Zahra Bagheri	Women's 87 kg	—N/a		Đỗ (VIE); W 001–000	Kubaýewa (TKM); L 000–100	Did not advance	3rd place, bronze medalist(s)

=== Muaythai ===
Athlete	Event	Round of 16	Quarterfinal	Semifinal	Final	Rank
Amir Hossein Kamari	Men's 54 kg	Baýramow (TKM); W 30–27	Kuchkorov (UZB); W 30–27	Sayassatov (KAZ); L 27–30	Did not advance	3rd place, bronze medalist(s)
Mostafa Tabtoukhzadeh	Men's 57 kg	Delarmino (PHI); L 28–29	Did not advance			9
Ali Zarinfar	Men's 60 kg	Bye	Sartkalmakov (KGZ); W RSC	Nurmetow (TKM); W 29–28	Chilnak (THA); W 29–28	1st place, gold medalist(s)
Masoud Abdolmaleki	Men's 63.5 kg	Sapmanee (THA); L 28–29	Did not advance			9
Reza Ahmadnejad	Men's 67 kg	Çaryýew (TKM); W RSC	Zhang (CHN); W 30–27	Samchaiyaphum (THA); L 27–30	Did not advance	3rd place, bronze medalist(s)
Kaveh Soleimani	Men's 71 kg	Mahmoud (MAS); W 29–28	Khatthamarasri (THA); L 27–30	Did not advance		5
Keivan Soleimani	Men's 75 kg	Aramchai (THA); W 29–28	Meläýew (TKM); W 30–26	Raad (IRQ); W 30–27	Loparev (KAZ); W 29–28	1st place, gold medalist(s)
Majid Hashembeigi	Men's 81 kg	Bye	Zabirov (TJK); W 30–27	Güýjow (TKM); W RSC	Umayev (KAZ); W 29–28	1st place, gold medalist(s)
Fatemeh Yavari	Women's 51 kg	Bye	Rezaye (AFG); W RSC	Jumaýewa (TKM); W RSC	Bùi (VIE); L 27–30	2nd place, silver medalist(s)
Somayyeh Khazaei	Women's 54 kg	—N/a	Xu (CHN); L 27–30	Did not advance		5
Saeideh Ghaffari	Women's 60 kg	—N/a	Bulaong (PHI); W RSC	Welmyradowa (TKM); W RSC	Wihantamma (THA); L 27–30	2nd place, silver medalist(s)
Zahra Bourbour	Women's 63.5 kg	—N/a	Atadurdyýewa (TKM); W 30–27	Trương (VIE); L 27–30	Did not advance	3rd place, bronze medalist(s)

=== Sambo ===
Athlete	Event	Round of 16	Quarterfinal	Semifinal	Repechage	Final	Rank
Mohammad Reza Saeidi	Men's 68 kg	Samak (AFG); W TT (10–0)	Kössekow (TKM); L TT (0–8)	Repechage; Falah (IRQ); W WO	Repechage; Te (KGZ); W 3–2	3rd place match Masiev (KGZ); W 9–7	3rd place, bronze medalist(s)
Yousef Karimian	Men's 74 kg	Tilavoldiev (UZB); L 0–1	Did not advance				13
Iraj Amirkhani	Men's 90 kg	Cazeñas (PHI); W 9–0	Mohammadi (AFG); W 10–0	Esgerow (TKM); L 0–8	Bye	3rd place match Taňryberdiýew (TKM); W 7–2	3rd place, bronze medalist(s)
Mohammad Kordabadi	Men's combat 57 kg	Bye	Ghusn (SYR); W 8–0	Taňryberdiýew (TKM); L 0–8	Bye	3rd place match Bayanduuren (MGL); L SUB (0–0)	5
Alireza Cheraghi	Men's combat 62 kg	Bye	Abtandil Uulu (KGZ); L 1–8	Did not advance	Repechage; Supygaliyev (KAZ); L 0–4	Did not advance	7
Pedram Beikzadeh	Men's combat 68 kg	Bye	Assadov (KAZ); L SUB (0–8)	Repechage; Mamatiminov (KGZ); L 5–8	Did not advance		9
Kamal Alikhah	Men's combat 82 kg	Bye	Madaminow (TKM); L SUB (0–5)	Repechage; Nurmatov (UZB); L SUB (0–0)	Did not advance		9
Milad Shiri	Men's combat +100 kg	—N/a	Prothien (THA); W KO (4–2)	Madaminow (TKM); L DSQ (0–3)	Bye	Kuzbakov (KAZ); W 9–0	3rd place, bronze medalist(s)

=== Short course swimming ===
Athlete	Event	Heats		Final	
Athlete	Event	Time	Rank	Time	Rank
Benyamin Gharehhassanloo	Men's 50 m freestyle	23.00	13	Did not advance	
Sina Gholampour	Men's 50 m freestyle	23.03	14	Did not advance	
Benyamin Gharehhassanloo	Men's 100 m freestyle	51.35	15	Did not advance	
Sina Gholampour	Men's 100 m freestyle	49.11	1 Q	49.04	6
Alireza Yavari	Men's 200 m freestyle	1:52.33	14	Did not advance	
Jamal Chavoshifar	Men's 50 m backstroke	26.01	12	Did not advance	
Mohsen Mehmannavaz	Men's 50 m backstroke	26.15	14	Did not advance	
Jamal Chavoshifar	Men's 100 m backstroke	56.87	12	Did not advance	
Soroush Ghandchi	Men's 100 m backstroke	56.77	11	Did not advance	
Mehdi Ansari	Men's 50 m breaststroke	27.98	8 Q	Withdrew	9
Aria Nasimi Shad	Men's 50 m breaststroke	28.32	10	Did not advance	
Mehdi Ansari	Men's 100 m breaststroke	1:00.76	8 Q	1:00.46	8
Aria Nasimi Shad	Men's 100 m breaststroke	1:02.28	15	Did not advance	
Mehdi Ansari	Men's 50 m butterfly	24.00	4 Q	23.76	4
Sina Gholampour	Men's 50 m butterfly	DNS	—	Did not advance	
Mehdi Ansari	Men's 100 m butterfly	53.23	3 Q	52.83	6
Alireza Yavari	Men's 100 m butterfly	DNS	—	Did not advance	
Mehdi Ansari	Men's 100 m individual medley	55.60	2 Q	55.58	4
Jamal Chavoshifar	Men's 100 m individual medley	58.13	12	Did not advance	
Mehdi Ansari; Benyamin Gharehhassanloo; Soroush Ghandchi; Sina Gholampour; Alireza Yavari (heats)	Men's 4 × 50 m freestyle relay	1:30.93	6 Q	1:30.18	6
Sina Gholampour; Alireza Yavari; Soroush Ghandchi; Benyamin Gharehhassanloo	Men's 4 × 100 m freestyle relay	3:20.76	2 Q	3:19.98	6
Jamal Chavoshifar; Aria Nasimi Shad; Mehdi Ansari; Sina Gholampour	Men's 4 × 50 m medley relay	1:40.52	6 Q	1:38.76	4
Jamal Chavoshifar; Aria Nasimi Shad; Mehdi Ansari; Sina Gholampour; Mohsen Mehmannavaz (heats); Alireza Yavari (heats)	Men's 4 × 100 m medley relay	3:40.87	3 Q	3:38.38	5

=== Taekwondo ===
Poomsae

Athlete	Event	Semifinal		Final	
Athlete	Event	Score	Rank	Score	Rank
Kourosh Bakhtiar	Men's individual	8.00	2 Q	8.23	3rd place, bronze medalist(s)
Ali Sohrabi	Men's individual	7.72	8 Q	8.17	5
Kourosh Bakhtiar; Mohammad Sadegh Fotouhi; Ali Sohrabi	Men's team	—N/a		8.38	2nd place, silver medalist(s)
Narges Minakhani	Women's individual	7.71	4 Q	7.90	7
Marjan Salahshouri	Women's individual	7.76	2 Q	8.12	1st place, gold medalist(s)
Marjan Salahshouri; Narges Minakhani; Mahsa Sadeghi	Women's team	—N/a		7.98	3rd place, bronze medalist(s)

Kyorugi

Athlete	Event	Round of 32	Round of 16	Quarterfinal	Semifinal	Final	Rank
Mehdi Eshaghi	Men's 54 kg	Bye	Gulamow (TKM); W 23–3	Hidayatullah (INA); W 23–2	Khegay (UZB); W 11–7	Nematov (TJK); W 23–5	1st place, gold medalist(s)
Hadi Tiran	Men's 58 kg	Bye	Lbzo (JOR); W 12–10	Ratanawangjaroen (THA); W 18–16	Pulatov (UZB); W 13–12	Jang (KOR); L PUN (10–31)	2nd place, silver medalist(s)
Soroush Ahmadi	Men's 63 kg	Bye	Jabbar (IRQ); W 24–7	Zain (AFG); W 24–9	Ho (TPE); W 18–4	Klompong (THA); W 10–7	1st place, gold medalist(s)
Mohammad Salar Vahidi	Men's 68 kg	Bye	Salaev (UZB); L RSC (15–17)	Did not advance			9
Mehdi Jalali	Men's 74 kg	Bye	Mangkheua (LAO); W 22–1	Morrison (PHI); W 26–15	Ren (CHN); W 21–13	Sarymsakov (KAZ); W 5–2	1st place, gold medalist(s)
Erfan Nazemi	Men's 80 kg	—N/a	Gheiase (AFG); W 25–6	Myrzabayev (KAZ); W 16–15	Al-Araimi (QAT); W 28–15	Chen (CHN); W 13–12	1st place, gold medalist(s)
Saeid Rajabi	Men's 87 kg	—N/a	Bye	Meyers (AUS); W 24–4	Bae (KOR); W 33–5	Liu (CHN); W 18–16	1st place, gold medalist(s)
Fatemeh Maddahi	Women's 46 kg	—N/a	Ilao (PHI); W 10–5	Lê (VIE); W 9–8	Tan (CHN); L 2–9	Did not advance	3rd place, bronze medalist(s)
Nahid Kiani	Women's 53 kg	—N/a	Gurung (NEP); W 22–2	Mamadibragimova (UZB); L 9–10	Did not advance		5
Tayyebeh Parsa	Women's 57 kg	—N/a	Akbari (AFG); W 23–6	Kim (KOR); W 22–18	Zhou (CHN); L 7–17	Did not advance	3rd place, bronze medalist(s)
Parisa Javadi	Women's 62 kg	—N/a	Paseka (TGA); W 31–0	Abdullaeva (UZB); W 10–5	Saelao (THA); W 15–13	Zhang (CHN); W 15–13	1st place, gold medalist(s)

=== Tennis ===
Athlete	Event	Round of 32	Round of 16	Quarterfinal	Semifinal	Final	Rank
Amir Vala Madanchi	Men's singles	Jacobe (VAN); W 2–1 (6–2, 5–7, 6–2)	Fayziev (UZB); L 0–2 (2–6, 0–6)	Did not advance			9
Hamid Reza Naddaf	Men's singles	Lambourne (KIR); W 2–0 (6–0, 6–0)	Yevseyev (KAZ); L 0–2 (4–6, 3–6)	Did not advance			9
Amir Vala Madanchi; Hamid Reza Naddaf	Men's doubles	—N/a	Sasongko and Trijati (INA); L 0–2 (2–6, 2–6)	Did not advance			9
Shahrzad Bani	Women's singles	Cheapchandej (THA); L 0–2 (3–6, 0–6)	Did not advance				17
Mahta Khanloo	Women's singles	Baýramowa (TKM); L 1–2 (6–3, 6–7, 5–7)	Did not advance				17
Shahrzad Bani; Mahta Khanloo	Women's doubles	—N/a	Fayssal and Habib (LBN); L 0–2 (5–7, 2–6)	Did not advance			9

=== Turkmen goresh ===
Freestyle

Athlete	Event	Round of 16	Quarterfinal	Semifinal	Final	Rank
Ghasem Norouzi	Men's 57 kg	—N/a	Qurbonov (TJK); L DSQ	Did not advance		5
Nasser Ghorbanpour	Men's 62 kg	—N/a	Ummatov (UZB); L DSQ	Did not advance		5
Esmaeil Amiri	Men's 68 kg	—N/a	Sotvoldiev (UZB); W 2–0	Berdiýew (TKM); L DSQ	Did not advance	3rd place, bronze medalist(s)
Ghasem Dazi	Men's 75 kg	—N/a	Ruziev (UZB); W 2–1	Welmämmedow (TKM); L 0–2	Did not advance	3rd place, bronze medalist(s)
Habibollah Torabi	Men's 82 kg	—N/a	Sultonov (TJK); W 1–0	Nuryýew (TKM); L DSQ	Did not advance	3rd place, bronze medalist(s)
Davoud Avazzadeh	Men's 90 kg	—N/a	Berdiýew (TKM); L 0–2	Did not advance		5
Abdolvahed Mohammadi	Men's +100 kg	Bye	Orazalyýew (TKM); L 0–2	Did not advance		5
Leila Siahvashi	Women's 52 kg	Bye	Ergasheva (UZB); L 0–2	Did not advance		5
Zahra Mahmoudi	Women's 58 kg	—N/a	Dadaboeva (UZB); L 0–2	Did not advance		5
Leila Salarvand	Women's 63 kg	Round robin Haýytbaýewa (TKM); L 0–2	Round robin Hallyýewa (TKM); L DSQ	Round robin Jurakuzieva (UZB); L DSQ	Round robin Mamadjonova (UZB); L DSQ	5
Zahra Majdi	Women's 70 kg	—N/a	Uzakowa (TKM); L 0–2	Did not advance		5
Saeideh Rahimi	Women's +70 kg	—N/a	Mönkhtsetseg (MGL); L 0–2	Did not advance		5

Classic style

Athlete	Event	Round of 32	Round of 16	Quarterfinal	Semifinal	Final	Rank
Ghasem Norouzi	Men's 57 kg	—N/a	Bye	Goçow (TKM); L 0–2	Did not advance		5
Nasser Ghorbanpour	Men's 62 kg	—N/a	Singh (IND); W DSQ	Enkhbold (MGL); L DSQ	Did not advance		5
Esmaeil Amiri	Men's 68 kg	—N/a	Khan (PAK); W 2–1	Sotvoldiev (UZB); L 0–2	Did not advance		5
Ghasem Dazi	Men's 75 kg	Bye	Orazow (TKM); L 0–2	Did not advance			9
Habibollah Torabi	Men's 82 kg	—N/a	Drigh (PAK); W 2–0	Mehraban (AFG); L 0–2	Did not advance		5
Hamed Mirzapour	Men's 90 kg	—N/a	Surve (IND); W 2–1	Karimzoda (TJK); W 2–0	Ahmadi (AFG); W 2–0	Atdaýew (TKM); L 1–2	2nd place, silver medalist(s)
Mahmoud Parvaneh	Men's 100 kg	—N/a	Kuldashev (UZB); L 0–1	Did not advance			9
Habib Gholampour	Men's +100 kg	—N/a	Orazalyýew (TKM); L 0–2	Did not advance			9
Leila Siahvashi	Women's 52 kg	—N/a	Ryskulova (KGZ); W 2–1	Ashiq (PAK); W 1–0	Badaglyýewa (TKM); L 0–2	Did not advance	3rd place, bronze medalist(s)
Reihaneh Sheikhian	Women's 58 kg	—N/a	Bye	Bhat (IND); W DSQ	Marsbek Kyzy (KGZ); L 0–1	Did not advance	3rd place, bronze medalist(s)
Sahar Ghanizadeh	Women's 63 kg	—N/a		Alibai Kyzy (KGZ); L 1–2	Did not advance		5
Sara Alipour	Women's 70 kg	—N/a	Bye	Uzakowa (TKM); L RET	Did not advance		5
Asieh Shojaei	Women's +70 kg	—N/a	Bye	Nyamtuyaa (MGL); L 0–2	Did not advance		5

=== Weightlifting ===
Athlete	Event	Snatch		Clean & Jerk		Total	
Athlete	Event	Result	Rank	Result	Rank	Result	Rank
Ali Miri	Men's 85 kg	160	4	201	2	361	3rd place, bronze medalist(s)
Sohrab Moradi	Men's 94 kg	185	1	228	1	413 WR	1st place, gold medalist(s)
Ali Hashemi	Men's 105 kg	181	2	220	2	401	2nd place, silver medalist(s)
Alireza Soleimani	Men's 105 kg	181	3	210	4	391	4
Homayoun Teymouri	Men's +105 kg	195	2	235	3	430	3rd place, bronze medalist(s)

=== Wrestling ===
Freestyle

Athlete	Event	Round of 32	Round of 16	Quarterfinal	Semifinal	Final	Rank
Nader Hajiaghania	Men's 57 kg	Bye	Abdullah (AFG); W RET (10–2)	Zholdoshbekov (KGZ); W 18–14	Tolepbay (KAZ); L Fall (0–4)	3rd place match Ataýew (TKM); W 6–2	3rd place, bronze medalist(s)
Iman Sadeghi	Men's 61 kg	—N/a	Tomar (IND); W 4–2	Ramazonov (TJK); W WO	Aitkulov (KAZ); W 7–2	Myradow (TKM); W 11–0	1st place, gold medalist(s)
Farzad Amouzad	Men's 65 kg	—N/a	Yeerlanbieke (CHN); W 8–6	Punia (IND); L 8–13	Repechage; Tarkong (PLW); W 10–0	3rd place match Fayziev (TJK); W 3–0	3rd place, bronze medalist(s)
Saeid Dadashpour	Men's 70 kg	—N/a	Sharipov (TJK); W 10–0	Batirov (BRN); L 4–4	Repechage; Misaalefua (ASA); W 10–0	3rd place match Sadeed (AFG); W Fall (10–0)	3rd place, bronze medalist(s)
Hossein Eliasi	Men's 74 kg	Bye	Renguul (PLW); W 11–0	Menghejigan (CHN); W 9–4	Zakirov (KAZ); W 10–0	Abdurakhmonov (UZB); L 6–12	2nd place, silver medalist(s)
Ezzatollah Akbari	Men's 86 kg	Bye	Lin (CHN); W 13–3	Inam (PAK); W 6–2	Davlumbayev (KAZ); W 16–8	Ismanov (UZB); W 9–2	1st place, gold medalist(s)
Mojtaba Goleij	Men's 97 kg	—N/a	Yang (CHN); W 8–1	Ahmadi (AFG); W 4–1	Melejaýew (TKM); W 14–3	Iskandari (TJK); W 10–0	1st place, gold medalist(s)
Yadollah Mohebbi	Men's 125 kg	—N/a	Salah (IRQ); W 11–0	Modzmanashvili (UZB); L 1–2	Repechage; Anakulov (TJK); W 14–4	3rd place match Shabanbay (KAZ); W 10–6	3rd place, bronze medalist(s)

Greco-Roman

Athlete	Event	Round of 32	Round of 16	Quarterfinal	Semifinal	Final	Rank
Mohsen Hajipour	Men's 59 kg	—N/a	Bakhromov (UZB); W 2–1	Mubaroq (INA); W 8–0	Täzäýew (TKM); W 5–1	Sulaimanov (KGZ); L 1–3	2nd place, silver medalist(s)
Amin Souri	Men's 66 kg	—N/a	Bye	Dahshan (JOR); W 9–0	Ui (JPN); W 2–2	Kalenov (KAZ); L 1–2	2nd place, silver medalist(s)
Farshad Belfakkeh	Men's 71 kg	—N/a	Tsarev (KGZ); W 4–1	Sultonshokhi (TJK); W 9–0	Vardanyan (UZB); W 4–1	Seýhow (TKM); W 11–2	1st place, gold medalist(s)
Pejman Poshtam	Men's 75 kg	Mcheik (LBN); W 8–0	Manatad (PHI); W 8–0	Malikkhil (AFG); W 11–1	Shadukayev (KAZ); W 8–4	Zhang (CHN); W 3–1	1st place, gold medalist(s)
Mehdi Ebrahimi	Men's 80 kg	—N/a		Dilmukhamedov (KAZ); W 3–2	Khashimbekov (UZB); W 7–0	Azisbekov (KGZ); W 3–2	1st place, gold medalist(s)
Saman Azizi	Men's 85 kg	—N/a	Annaýew (TKM); W 3–1	Mutsolgov (KAZ); W 7–1	Beishebekov (KGZ); W 1–1	Khatri (IND); W 4–1	1st place, gold medalist(s)
Amir Hossein Hosseini	Men's 98 kg	—N/a	Bye	Kuliýew (TKM); W 8–1	Nara (JPN); W 1–1	Dzhuzupbekov (KGZ); W 3–2	1st place, gold medalist(s)
Behnam Mehdizadeh	Men's 130 kg	—N/a	Tinaliyev (KAZ); W 3–2	Kaizuka (JPN); W 7–3	Meng (CHN); W 1–0	Sevlia (IND); W 2–0	1st place, gold medalist(s)

== Demonstration sports ==
=== Esports ===
Athlete	Event	Preliminary round				Quarterfinal	Semifinal	Final	Rank
Athlete	Event	Round 1	Round 2	Round 3	Rank	Quarterfinal	Semifinal	Final	Rank
Nikan Sabouri	StarCraft	Zhou (CHN); L 0–2	Mayor (PHI); L 0–2	Huang (TPE); L 0–2	4	Did not advance			7
Ali Soltanabadi	The King of Fighters	Hameed (PAK); W 3–0	Farooq (PAK); W 3–1	Panganiban (PHI); L 0–3	2 Q	Lin (TPE); L 0–3	Did not advance		5
