= Muaythai at the 2017 Asian Indoor and Martial Arts Games =

- Venue: Ashgabat Muay Kickboxing Arena
- Dates: 17–21 September 2017

Muaythai at the 2017 Asian Indoor and Martial Arts Games was held at the Muay Kickboxing Arena in Ashgabat, Turkmenistan from 17 to 21 September 2017.

== Medalists ==
=== Men ===
Event	Gold	Silver	Bronze
Bantamweight; 51–54 kg	Arnon Phonkrathok; Thailand	Yelaman Sayassatov; Kazakhstan	Luo Chenghao; China
Bantamweight; 51–54 kg	Arnon Phonkrathok; Thailand	Yelaman Sayassatov; Kazakhstan	Amir Hossein Kamari; Iran
Featherweight; 54–57 kg	Chotichanin Kokkrachai; Thailand	Phillip Delarmino; Philippines	Rüstem Baýramdurdyýew; Turkmenistan
Featherweight; 54–57 kg	Chotichanin Kokkrachai; Thailand	Phillip Delarmino; Philippines	Almaz Sarsembekov; Kazakhstan
Lightweight; 57–60 kg	Ali Zarinfar; Iran	Prawit Chilnak; Thailand	Adylbek Nurmetow; Turkmenistan
Lightweight; 57–60 kg	Ali Zarinfar; Iran	Prawit Chilnak; Thailand	Yerkanat Ospan; Kazakhstan
Light welterweight 60–63.5 kg	Ruthaiphan Sapmanee; Thailand	Abil Galiyev; Kazakhstan	Nurgeldi Ataýew; Turkmenistan
Light welterweight 60–63.5 kg	Ruthaiphan Sapmanee; Thailand	Abil Galiyev; Kazakhstan	Ameer Ibrahim; Iraq
Welterweight; 63.5–67 kg	Mustafa Saparmyradow; Turkmenistan	Mana Samchaiyaphum; Thailand	Bekzhan Matysaev; Kyrgyzstan
Welterweight; 63.5–67 kg	Mustafa Saparmyradow; Turkmenistan	Mana Samchaiyaphum; Thailand	Reza Ahmadnejad; Iran
Light middleweight 67–71 kg	Anueng Khatthamarasri; Thailand	Guo Dongwang; China	Namik Neftaliyev; Kazakhstan
Light middleweight 67–71 kg	Anueng Khatthamarasri; Thailand	Guo Dongwang; China	Nguyễn Thanh Tùng; Vietnam
Middleweight; 71–75 kg	Keivan Soleimani; Iran	Vadim Loparev; Kazakhstan	Ýusup Bäşimow; Turkmenistan
Middleweight; 71–75 kg	Keivan Soleimani; Iran	Vadim Loparev; Kazakhstan	Mustafa Raad; Iraq
Light heavyweight 75–81 kg	Majid Hashembeigi; Iran	Emil Umayev; Kazakhstan	Ubbiniyaz Tureniyazov; Uzbekistan
Light heavyweight 75–81 kg	Majid Hashembeigi; Iran	Emil Umayev; Kazakhstan	Döwletmyrat Güýjow; Turkmenistan
Cruiserweight; 81–86 kg	Shahez Fazil; Iraq	Mohammad Al-Barri; Jordan	Hayatullah Khairi; Afghanistan
Cruiserweight; 81–86 kg	Shahez Fazil; Iraq	Mohammad Al-Barri; Jordan	Davlat Boltaev; Tajikistan

=== Women ===
Event	Gold	Silver	Bronze
Flyweight; 48–51 kg	Bùi Yến Ly; Vietnam	Fatemeh Yavari; Iran	Cheryl Gwa; Singapore
Flyweight; 48–51 kg	Bùi Yến Ly; Vietnam	Fatemeh Yavari; Iran	Selbi Jumaýewa; Turkmenistan
Bantamweight; 51–54 kg	Yadrung Tehiran; Thailand	Ýaňyl Kawisowa; Turkmenistan	Xu Yi; China
Bantamweight; 51–54 kg	Yadrung Tehiran; Thailand	Ýaňyl Kawisowa; Turkmenistan	Zohra Rezaye; Afghanistan
Featherweight; 54–57 kg	Jennet Aýnazarowa; Turkmenistan	Sirisopa Sirisak; Thailand	Maya Houdroge; Lebanon
Featherweight; 54–57 kg	Jennet Aýnazarowa; Turkmenistan	Sirisopa Sirisak; Thailand	Gülşat Gylyjowa; Turkmenistan
Lightweight; 57–60 kg	Ratchadaphon Wihantamma; Thailand	Saeideh Ghaffari; Iran	Enejan Welmyradowa; Turkmenistan
Lightweight; 57–60 kg	Ratchadaphon Wihantamma; Thailand	Saeideh Ghaffari; Iran	Chen Linling; China
Light welterweight 60–63.5 kg	Janejira Wankrue; Thailand	Trương Thị Hồng Nga; Vietnam	Rola Khaled; Lebanon
Light welterweight 60–63.5 kg	Janejira Wankrue; Thailand	Trương Thị Hồng Nga; Vietnam	Zahra Bourbour; Iran

== Medal table ==
Rank	Nation	Gold	Silver	Bronze	Total
1	Thailand (THA)	7	3	0	10
2	Iran (IRI)	3	2	3	8
3	Turkmenistan (TKM)	2	1	8	11
4	Vietnam (VIE)	1	1	1	3
5	Iraq (IRQ)	1	0	2	3
6	Kazakhstan (KAZ)	0	4	3	7
7	China (CHN)	0	1	3	4
8	Jordan (JOR)	0	1	0	1
8	Philippines (PHI)	0	1	0	1
10	Afghanistan (AFG)	0	0	2	2
10	Lebanon (LBN)	0	0	2	2
12	Kyrgyzstan (KGZ)	0	0	1	1
12	Singapore (SGP)	0	0	1	1
12	Tajikistan (TJK)	0	0	1	1
12	Uzbekistan (UZB)	0	0	1	1
Totals (15 entries)		14	14	28	56

== Results ==
=== Men ===
==== 54 kg ====
Round of 16; 18 September
Elazan Zamirbekov (KGZ)	28
Manuchehr Nazrivali (TJK)	29
Luo Chenghao (CHN)	30
Kwok Wai Hon (HKG)	27
Ahmad Hassanzada (AFG)	29
Gary Tang (HKG)	28
Farhat Döwletnazarow (TKM)	27
Arnon Phonkrathok (THA)	30
Mukhammadjon Kuchkorov (UZB)	30
Chen Yu-xi (TPE)	27
Bäşim Baýramow (TKM)	27
Amir Hossein Kamari (IRI)	30
Ali Saddam (IRQ)	30
Ali Jaghl (SYR)	27
Yelaman Sayassatov (KAZ)	30
Ariel Lampacan (PHI)	27

Quarterfinals; 19 September
Manuchehr Nazrivali (TJK)	28
Luo Chenghao (CHN)	29
Ahmad Hassanzada (AFG)	27
Arnon Phonkrathok (THA)	30
Mukhammadjon Kuchkorov (UZB)	27
Amir Hossein Kamari (IRI)	30
Ali Saddam (IRQ)	27
Yelaman Sayassatov (KAZ)	30

Semifinals; 20 September
Luo Chenghao (CHN)	27
Arnon Phonkrathok (THA)	30
Amir Hossein Kamari (IRI)	27
Yelaman Sayassatov (KAZ)	30

Final; 21 September
Arnon Phonkrathok (THA)	29
Yelaman Sayassatov (KAZ)	28

==== 57 kg ====
Round of 16; 18 September
Mostafa Tabtoukhzadeh (IRI)	28
Phillip Delarmino (PHI)	29
Jakhangir Yuldashev (UZB)	29
Nguyễn Doãn Long (VIE)	28
Sadi Sharipov (TJK)
Chotichanin Kokkrachai (THA)	DSQ
Ahmad Shuja Jamal (AFG)	29
Muhammad Taqi Alizada (AFG)	28
Resul Araşow (TKM)
Mohamad Kalach (LBN)	RSC

Quarterfinals; 19 September
Rüstem Baýramdurdyýew (TKM)	RSC
Hung Chia-ho (TPE)
Phillip Delarmino (PHI)	30
Jakhangir Yuldashev (UZB)	27
Chotichanin Kokkrachai (THA)	30
Ahmad Shuja Jamal (AFG)	27
Almaz Sarsembekov (KAZ)	RSC
Mohamad Kalach (LBN)

Semifinals; 20 September
Rüstem Baýramdurdyýew (TKM)	27
Phillip Delarmino (PHI)	30
Chotichanin Kokkrachai (THA)	30
Almaz Sarsembekov (KAZ)	27

Final; 21 September
Phillip Delarmino (PHI)	27
Chotichanin Kokkrachai (THA)	30

==== 60 kg ====
Round of 16; 17 September
Prawit Chilnak (THA)	30
Mahmoud Ghandour (LBN)	27
Ahmed Abbood (IRQ)	30
Maksatmurad Alyýew (TKM)	27
Yerkanat Ospan (KAZ)	30
Sayed Jamal Sadat (AFG)	26

Quarterfinals; 19 September
Chen Yahong (CHN)	27
Adylbek Nurmetow (TKM)	30
Ali Zarinfar (IRI)	RSC
Mirbek Sartkalmakov (KGZ)
Nguyễn Trần Duy Nhất (VIE)	27
Prawit Chilnak (THA)	30
Ahmed Abbood (IRQ)	27
Yerkanat Ospan (KAZ)	30

Semifinals; 20 September
Adylbek Nurmetow (TKM)	28
Ali Zarinfar (IRI)	29
Prawit Chilnak (THA)	30
Yerkanat Ospan (KAZ)	27

Final; 21 September
Ali Zarinfar (IRI)	29
Prawit Chilnak (THA)	28

==== 63.5 kg ====
Round of 16; 18 September
Timur Mamatisakov (KGZ)	30
Võ Văn Đài (VIE)	27
Chan Chi Lam (MAC)
Nurgeldi Ataýew (TKM)	RSC
Yousuf Jahangir (AFG)	30
Yang Pengbin (CHN)	27
Karimjon Karimov (UZB)	28
Ryan Jakiri (PHI)	29
Ameer Ibrahim (IRQ)	30
Hangeldi Berdiýew (TKM)	27
Yang Yunpeng (CHN)
Jawad Ghaljaee (AFG)	RSC
Masoud Abdolmaleki (IRI)	28
Ruthaiphan Sapmanee (THA)	29

Quarterfinals; 19 September
Abil Galiyev (KAZ)	KOB
Timur Mamatisakov (KGZ)
Nurgeldi Ataýew (TKM)	30
Yousuf Jahangir (AFG)	27
Ryan Jakiri (PHI)
Ameer Ibrahim (IRQ)	RSC
Jawad Ghaljaee (AFG)	27
Ruthaiphan Sapmanee (THA)	30

Semifinals; 20 September
Abil Galiyev (KAZ)	WO
Nurgeldi Ataýew (TKM)
Ameer Ibrahim (IRQ)	26
Ruthaiphan Sapmanee (THA)	30

Final; 21 September
Abil Galiyev (KAZ)	27
Ruthaiphan Sapmanee (THA)	30

==== 67 kg ====
Round of 16; 18 September
Nawaraj Gurung (NEP)
Lei Ka Lon (MAC)	WO
Sunduin Batjargal (MGL)
Nikolay Samussev (KAZ)	WO
Mana Samchaiyaphum (THA)	30
Akram Hasan (IRQ)	27
Zhang Jinglei (CHN)	30
Abdul Hakim Mobariz (AFG)	27
Reza Ahmadnejad (IRI)	RSC
Serdar Çaryýew (TKM)

Quarterfinals; 19 September
Mustafa Saparmyradow (TKM)	RSC
Shan Yanbin (CHN)
Bekzhan Matysaev (KGZ)	RSC
Lei Ka Lon (MAC)
Nikolay Samussev (KAZ)	27
Mana Samchaiyaphum (THA)	30
Zhang Jinglei (CHN)	27
Reza Ahmadnejad (IRI)	30

Semifinals; 20 September
Mustafa Saparmyradow (TKM)	KOB
Bekzhan Matysaev (KGZ)
Mana Samchaiyaphum (THA)	30
Reza Ahmadnejad (IRI)	27

Final; 21 September
Mustafa Saparmyradow (TKM)	30
Mana Samchaiyaphum (THA)	27

==== 71 kg ====
Round of 16; 18 September
Kaveh Soleimani (IRI)	29
Nidal Mahmoud (MAS)	28
Eddy Tuuhia (TAH)	26
Anueng Khatthamarasri (THA)	30

Quarterfinals; 19 September
Muhammetberdi Rowşanow (TKM)	28
Guo Dongwang (CHN)	29
Namik Neftaliyev (KAZ)	30
Saimuhammad Sharipov (TJK)	27
Anwar Haitow (TKM)
Nguyễn Thanh Tùng (VIE)	RSCI
Kaveh Soleimani (IRI)	27
Anueng Khatthamarasri (THA)	30

Semifinals; 20 September
Guo Dongwang (CHN)	29
Namik Neftaliyev (KAZ)	28
Nguyễn Thanh Tùng (VIE)
Anueng Khatthamarasri (THA)	RSC

Final; 21 September
Guo Dongwang (CHN)	28
Anueng Khatthamarasri (THA)	29

==== 75 kg ====
Round of 16; 18 September
Zhang Yongkang (CHN)	27
Hussain Hussaini (AFG)	30
Nguyễn Trung Kiên (VIE)
Mustafa Raad (IRQ)	RET
Muhammetnur Meläýew (TKM)	30
Alijon Isroilov (UZB)	26
Wanchalerm Aramchai (THA)	28
Keivan Soleimani (IRI)	29

Quarterfinals; 19 September
Ýusup Bäşimow (TKM)	RSC
Abdallah Al-Jabbareen (JOR)
Vadim Loparev (KAZ)	RSC
Raja Benoît (TAH)
Hussain Hussaini (AFG)
Mustafa Raad (IRQ)	RSC
Muhammetnur Meläýew (TKM)	26
Keivan Soleimani (IRI)	30

Semifinals; 20 September
Ýusup Bäşimow (TKM)	27
Vadim Loparev (KAZ)	30
Mustafa Raad (IRQ)	27
Keivan Soleimani (IRI)	30

Final; 21 September
Vadim Loparev (KAZ)	28
Keivan Soleimani (IRI)	29

==== 81 kg ====
Round of 16; 17 September
Siyovush Zabirov (TJK)	29
Mohammad Salama (JOR)	27
Farid Bahar (AFG)	28
Luo Can (CHN)	29
Döwletmyrat Güýjow (TKM)	RSC
Du An (CHN)

Quarterfinals; 19 September
Namo Fazil (IRQ)
Emil Umayev (KAZ)	RSC
Kuwatmyrat Ilmyradow (TKM)
Ubbiniyaz Tureniyazov (UZB)	DSQ
Majid Hashembeigi (IRI)	30
Siyovush Zabirov (TJK)	27
Luo Can (CHN)	27
Döwletmyrat Güýjow (TKM)	30

Semifinals; 20 September
Emil Umayev (KAZ)	30
Ubbiniyaz Tureniyazov (UZB)	27
Majid Hashembeigi (IRI)	RSC
Döwletmyrat Güýjow (TKM)

Final; 21 September
Emil Umayev (KAZ)	28
Majid Hashembeigi (IRI)	29

==== 86 kg ====
Quarterfinals; 19 September
Hayatullah Khairi (AFG)	RSC
Rasul Rasulow (TKM)
Aitotea Lenoir (TAH)	27
Mohammad Al-Barri (JOR)	30
Ýalkapberdi Tejenow (TKM)
Davlat Boltaev (TJK)	RSC
Islomjon Marufov (UZB)	27
Shahez Fazil (IRQ)	30

Semifinals; 20 September
Hayatullah Khairi (AFG)
Mohammad Al-Barri (JOR)	WO
Davlat Boltaev (TJK)
Shahez Fazil (IRQ)	RET

Final; 21 September
Mohammad Al-Barri (JOR)
Shahez Fazil (IRQ)	RSC

=== Women ===
==== 51 kg ====
Round of 16; 18 September
Zahra Rezaye (AFG)	30
Frishta Zafari (AFG)	27

Quarterfinals; 19 September
Carissa Tarapen (PHI)	27
Bùi Yến Ly (VIE)	30
Merjen Saparowa (TKM)
Cheryl Gwa (SGP)	RSC
Selbi Jumaýewa (TKM)	30
Pan Ting-wei (TPE)	27
Fatemeh Yavari (IRI)	RSC
Zahra Rezaye (AFG)

Semifinals; 20 September
Bùi Yến Ly (VIE)	30
Cheryl Gwa (SGP)	27
Selbi Jumaýewa (TKM)
Fatemeh Yavari (IRI)	RSC

Final; 21 September
Bùi Yến Ly (VIE)	30
Fatemeh Yavari (IRI)	27

==== 54 kg ====
Quarterfinals; 19 September
Xu Yi (CHN)	30
Somayyeh Khazaei (IRI)	27
Yadrung Tehiran (THA)	30
Aýimžan Sultanowa (TKM)	27
Hung Chiao-en (TPE)
Ýaňyl Kawisowa (TKM)	RSC
Zohra Rezaye (AFG)	29
Razia Hassani (AFG)	28

Semifinals; 20 September
Xu Yi (CHN)	27
Yadrung Tehiran (THA)	30
Ýaňyl Kawisowa (TKM)	RSC
Zohra Rezaye (AFG)

Final; 21 September
Yadrung Tehiran (THA)	30
Ýaňyl Kawisowa (TKM)	27

==== 57 kg ====
Quarterfinals; 19 September
Zahra Rezaee (AFG)	28
Gülşat Gylyjowa (TKM)	29

Semifinals; 20 September
Jennet Aýnazarowa (TKM)	RSC
Maya Houdroge (LBN)
Sirisopa Sirisak (THA)	30
Gülşat Gylyjowa (TKM)	26

Final; 21 September
Jennet Aýnazarowa (TKM)	RSC
Sirisopa Sirisak (THA)

==== 60 kg ====
Quarterfinals; 19 September
Geli Bulaong (PHI)
Saeideh Ghaffari (IRI)	RSC
Nabat Batyrowa (TKM)
Chen Linling (CHN)	KOB
Ratchadaphon Wihantamma (THA)	RSC
Kinda Fattal (LBN)

Semifinals; 20 September
Enejan Welmyradowa (TKM)
Saeideh Ghaffari (IRI)	RSC
Chen Linling (CHN)	27
Ratchadaphon Wihantamma (THA)	30

Final; 21 September
Saeideh Ghaffari (IRI)	27
Ratchadaphon Wihantamma (THA)	30

==== 63.5 kg ====
Quarterfinals; 19 September
Ogulnur Hudaýbergenowa (TKM)	27
Rola Khaled (LBN)	29
Zahra Bourbour (IRI)	30
Aýgül Atadurdyýewa (TKM)	27
Anna Yon Yue Chong (TAH)	28
Trương Thị Hồng Nga (VIE)	29

Semifinals; 20 September
Janejira Wankrue (THA)	RSC
Rola Khaled (LBN)
Zahra Bourbour (IRI)	27
Trương Thị Hồng Nga (VIE)	30

Final; 21 September
Janejira Wankrue (THA)	RSC
Trương Thị Hồng Nga (VIE)
