= Kazakh kuresi at the 2017 Asian Indoor and Martial Arts Games =

- Venue: Ashgabat Main Indoor Arena
- Dates: 21 September 2017

Kazakh kuresi as a part of belt wrestling competition was contested at the 2017 Asian Indoor and Martial Arts Games in Ashgabat, Turkmenistan on 21 September 2017. The competition took place at Ashgabat Main Indoor Arena.

== Medalists ==
Event	Gold	Silver	Bronze
70 kg	Kassymkhan Tulenbay; Kazakhstan	Işanmyrat Ataýew; Turkmenistan	Mirlan Eraliev; Kyrgyzstan
70 kg	Kassymkhan Tulenbay; Kazakhstan	Işanmyrat Ataýew; Turkmenistan	Ylýas Momunow; Turkmenistan
90 kg	Tejen Tejenow; Turkmenistan	Emomnazar Karimzoda; Tajikistan	Keduovilie Zumu; India
90 kg	Tejen Tejenow; Turkmenistan	Emomnazar Karimzoda; Tajikistan	Adilzhan Istibayev; Kazakhstan
+90 kg	Aibek Nugymarov; Kazakhstan	Tilek Kuralov; Kyrgyzstan	Gongoryn Pürevbaatar; Mongolia
+90 kg	Aibek Nugymarov; Kazakhstan	Tilek Kuralov; Kyrgyzstan	Kuwwat Nuryýew; Turkmenistan

== Medal table ==
Rank	Nation	Gold	Silver	Bronze	Total
1	Kazakhstan (KAZ)	2	0	1	3
2	Turkmenistan (TKM)	1	1	2	4
3	Kyrgyzstan (KGZ)	0	1	1	2
4	Tajikistan (TJK)	0	1	0	1
5	India (IND)	0	0	1	1
5	Mongolia (MGL)	0	0	1	1
Totals (6 entries)		3	3	6	12

== Results ==
=== 70 kg ===
21 September

1/8 finals
Mukhammadrizvon Azizi (TJK)	0111
Kassymkhan Tulenbay (KAZ)	1002
Tatsuma Kurosaki (JPN)	0000
Ylýas Momunow (TKM)	0011
Shakhobiddin Sangilov (UZB)	1100
Niranjan Karlekar (IND)	0002

Quarterfinals
Mirlan Eraliev (KGZ)	1010
Enkhtaivany Enkhbold (MGL)	0002
Işanmyrat Ataýew (TKM)	0012
Omid Khedmati (IRI)	0001
Paul Dickinson (IND)	0000
Kassymkhan Tulenbay (KAZ)	1000
Ylýas Momunow (TKM)	1001
Shakhobiddin Sangilov (UZB)	0000

Semifinals
Mirlan Eraliev (KGZ)	0001
Işanmyrat Ataýew (TKM)	0102
Kassymkhan Tulenbay (KAZ)	1000
Ylýas Momunow (TKM)	0001

Final
Işanmyrat Ataýew (TKM)	0002
Kassymkhan Tulenbay (KAZ)	1001

Repechage round 1
Mukhammadrizvon Azizi (TJK)	0000
Paul Dickinson (IND)	1000

Repechage bronze
Omid Khedmati (IRI)	0100
Mirlan Eraliev (KGZ)	1100
Paul Dickinson (IND)	0000
Ylýas Momunow (TKM)	1000

=== 90 kg ===
21 September

1/8 finals
Chingiz Chalabaev (KGZ)	1001
Giyosiddin Rajabzoda (TJK)	0000
Nuraly Ýalkapow (TKM)	0101
Adilzhan Istibayev (KAZ)	0111

Quarterfinals
Akshay Shivaji Surve (IND)	0011
Agung Mulyana (INA)	0011
Keduovilie Zumu (IND)	0000
Emomnazar Karimzoda (TJK)	1000
Ali Mehdizadeh (IRI)	0001
Tejen Tejenow (TKM)	1002
Chingiz Chalabaev (KGZ)	0000
Adilzhan Istibayev (KAZ)	1012

Semifinals
Akshay Shivaji Surve (IND)	0000
Emomnazar Karimzoda (TJK)	1000
Tejen Tejenow (TKM)	1101
Adilzhan Istibayev (KAZ)	0102

Final
Emomnazar Karimzoda (TJK)	0000
Tejen Tejenow (TKM)	1001

Repechage bronze
Keduovilie Zumu (IND)	1000
Akshay Shivaji Surve (IND)	0000
Ali Mehdizadeh (IRI)	0000
Adilzhan Istibayev (KAZ)	1001

=== +90 kg ===
21 September

1/8 finals
Dilovar Gulov (TJK)	0000
Aibek Nugymarov (KAZ)	1012
Saeid Ghasemi (IRI)	0011
Kuwwat Nuryýew (TKM)	0111
Baataryn Batbold (MGL)	0000
Nazar Durdyýew (TKM)	1011
Abdusalom Salomov (TJK)	1000
Odiljon Suyunov (UZB)	0100

Quarterfinals
Gongoryn Pürevbaatar (MGL)	1000
Edi Sudrajat (INA)	0000
Vechita Khesoh (IND)	0000
Tilek Kuralov (KGZ)	1000
Aibek Nugymarov (KAZ)	0011
Kuwwat Nuryýew (TKM)	0000
Nazar Durdyýew (TKM)	1000
Abdusalom Salomov (TJK)	0000

Semifinals
Gongoryn Pürevbaatar (MGL)	0002
Tilek Kuralov (KGZ)	1000
Aibek Nugymarov (KAZ)	1001
Nazar Durdyýew (TKM)	0000

Final
Tilek Kuralov (KGZ)	0000
Aibek Nugymarov (KAZ)	1111

Repechage round 1
Dilovar Gulov (TJK)	0000
Kuwwat Nuryýew (TKM)	1011

Repechage bronze
Vechita Khesoh (IND)	0000
Gongoryn Pürevbaatar (MGL)	1111
Kuwwat Nuryýew (TKM)	0112
Nazar Durdyýew (TKM)	0010
