= Pahlavani wrestling at the 2017 Asian Indoor and Martial Arts Games =

- Venue: Ashgabat Main Indoor Arena
- Dates: 21 September 2017

Pahlavani wrestling as a part of belt wrestling competition was contested at the 2017 Asian Indoor and Martial Arts Games in Ashgabat, Turkmenistan on 21 September 2017. The competition took place at Ashgabat Main Indoor Arena.

== Medalists ==
Event	Gold	Silver	Bronze
70 kg	Mohammad Naderi; Iran	Süleýman Omarow; Turkmenistan	Boldkhüügiin Sükhbat; Mongolia
70 kg	Mohammad Naderi; Iran	Süleýman Omarow; Turkmenistan	Aidarbek Aitiev; Kyrgyzstan
90 kg	Arashk Mohebbi; Iran	Muhammad Adnan; Pakistan	Masrur Meralishoev; Tajikistan
90 kg	Arashk Mohebbi; Iran	Muhammad Adnan; Pakistan	Ýakup Meredow; Turkmenistan
+90 kg	Ahmad Mirzapour; Iran	Farkhod Anakulov; Tajikistan	Chinbatyn Altangerel; Mongolia
+90 kg	Ahmad Mirzapour; Iran	Farkhod Anakulov; Tajikistan	Wadim Petrosýan; Turkmenistan

== Medal table ==
Rank	Nation	Gold	Silver	Bronze	Total
1	Iran (IRI)	3	0	0	3
2	Turkmenistan (TKM)	0	1	2	3
3	Tajikistan (TJK)	0	1	1	2
4	Pakistan (PAK)	0	1	0	1
5	Mongolia (MGL)	0	0	2	2
6	Kyrgyzstan (KGZ)	0	0	1	1
Totals (6 entries)		3	3	6	12

== Results ==
=== 70 kg ===
21 September

1/8 finals
Dharmender (IND)	5
Ari Dwi Riyatna (INA)	6
Boldkhüügiin Sükhbat (MGL)	2
Mohammad Naderi (IRI)	6^{F}
Fedaaldin Al-Asta (SYR)	0
Sorbon Abdulkhaev (TJK)	6^{F}
Qamar Abbas (PAK)	2^{F}
Argen Turatbek Uulu (KGZ)	0
Süleýman Omarow (TKM)	6^{F}
Gurbanmyrat Öwezberdiýew (TKM)	5
Tatsuma Kurosaki (JPN)	4^{F}
Ali Amzad (BAN)	0
Audumbar Maruti Kokare (IND)	2^{F}
Ali Nizam (LBN)	0
Joseph Angana (PHI)	0
Aidarbek Aitiev (KGZ)	4^{F}

Quarterfinals
Ari Dwi Riyatna (INA)	0
Mohammad Naderi (IRI)	4^{F}
Sorbon Abdulkhaev (TJK)	2
Qamar Abbas (PAK)	6^{F}
Süleýman Omarow (TKM)	7^{F}
Tatsuma Kurosaki (JPN)	0
Audumbar Maruti Kokare (IND)	0
Aidarbek Aitiev (KGZ)	2^{F}

Semifinals
Mohammad Naderi (IRI)	2^{F}
Qamar Abbas (PAK)	0
Süleýman Omarow (TKM)	5
Aidarbek Aitiev (KGZ)	1

Final
Mohammad Naderi (IRI)	4
Süleýman Omarow (TKM)	4

Repechage round 1
Boldkhüügiin Sükhbat (MGL)	2^{F}
Ari Dwi Riyatna (INA)	0
Gurbanmyrat Öwezberdiýew (TKM)	4^{F}
Tatsuma Kurosaki (JPN)	0

Repechage bronze
Boldkhüügiin Sükhbat (MGL)	7^{F}
Qamar Abbas (PAK)	1
Gurbanmyrat Öwezberdiýew (TKM)	0^{DQ}
Aidarbek Aitiev (KGZ)	2

=== 90 kg ===
21 September

1/8 finals
Michel Al-Soury (LBN)	1
Senie Kristian (INA)	4^{F}
Sangram Vilas Jadhav (IND)	0
Atul Suresh Shirole (IND)	4^{F}
Ýakup Meredow (TKM)	0
Arashk Mohebbi (IRI)	2^{F}
Abdur Roshid Hawladar (BAN)	0
Alişer Dustow (TKM)	2^{F}

Quarterfinals
Muhammad Adnan (PAK)	2^{F}
Masrur Meralishoev (TJK)	1
Christof Hofmann (PHI)	0
Benjamin Teo (SGP)	2^{F}
Senie Kristian (INA)	4^{F}
Atul Suresh Shirole (IND)	0
Arashk Mohebbi (IRI)	10
Alişer Dustow (TKM)	0

Semifinals
Muhammad Adnan (PAK)	2^{F}
Benjamin Teo (SGP)	0
Senie Kristian (INA)	0
Arashk Mohebbi (IRI)	6^{F}

Final
Muhammad Adnan (PAK)	0
Arashk Mohebbi (IRI)	10^{F}

Repechage round 1
Ýakup Meredow (TKM)	4^{F}
Alişer Dustow (TKM)	0

Repechage bronze
Masrur Meralishoev (TJK)	6^{F}
Benjamin Teo (SGP)	0
Ýakup Meredow (TKM)	2^{F}
Senie Kristian (INA)	2

=== +90 kg ===
21 September

1/8 finals
Arzuubek Karybekov (KGZ)	10^{F}
Zaman Anwar (PAK)	2

Quarterfinals
Menuosetuo Yiese (IND)	0
Chinbatyn Altangerel (MGL)	4^{F}
Baataryn Batbold (MGL)	0
Ahmad Mirzapour (IRI)	2^{F}
Wadim Petrosýan (TKM)	8^{F}
Elnur Açylow (TKM)	2
Farkhod Anakulov (TJK)	7^{F}
Arzuubek Karybekov (KGZ)	0

Semifinals
Chinbatyn Altangerel (MGL)	0
Ahmad Mirzapour (IRI)	6^{F}
Wadim Petrosýan (TKM)	0
Farkhod Anakulov (TJK)	6^{F}

Final
Ahmad Mirzapour (IRI)	4^{F}
Farkhod Anakulov (TJK)	0

Repechage bronze
Baataryn Batbold (MGL)	0
Chinbatyn Altangerel (MGL)	2^{F}
Arzuubek Karybekov (KGZ)	0
Wadim Petrosýan (TKM)	5^{F}
