= Alysh at the 2017 Asian Indoor and Martial Arts Games =

- Venue: Ashgabat Main Indoor Arena
- Dates: 22–23 September 2017

Alysh as a part of belt wrestling competition was contested at the 2017 Asian Indoor and Martial Arts Games in Ashgabat, Turkmenistan from 22 to 23 September 2017. The competition took place at Ashgabat Main Indoor Arena.

== Medalists ==
=== Men's freestyle ===
| Event | Gold | Silver | Bronze |
|---|---|---|---|
| 60 kg | Tirkişgeldi Aýazow; Turkmenistan | Ibodullo Aliberdizoda; Tajikistan | Mehrzod Sufiev; Tajikistan |
| 60 kg | Tirkişgeldi Aýazow; Turkmenistan | Ibodullo Aliberdizoda; Tajikistan | Abdurasul Khabibullaev; Uzbekistan |
| 70 kg | Hangeldi Allakow; Turkmenistan | Behruz Gulmahmadzoda; Tajikistan | Madaminbek Sharshenaly Uulu; Kyrgyzstan |
| 70 kg | Hangeldi Allakow; Turkmenistan | Behruz Gulmahmadzoda; Tajikistan | Jangeldi Medow; Turkmenistan |
| 80 kg | Garmämmet Şamämmedow; Turkmenistan | Giyosiddin Rajabzoda; Tajikistan | Eldor Nematov; Uzbekistan |
| 80 kg | Garmämmet Şamämmedow; Turkmenistan | Giyosiddin Rajabzoda; Tajikistan | Aly Allaberdiýew; Turkmenistan |
| 90 kg | Arslan Ybraýymgulyýew; Turkmenistan | Nurbek Kozhobekov; Kyrgyzstan | Khurshed Sharipov; Tajikistan |
| 90 kg | Arslan Ybraýymgulyýew; Turkmenistan | Nurbek Kozhobekov; Kyrgyzstan | Obidali Mavlonov; Uzbekistan |
| 100 kg | Seýdi Batyrow; Turkmenistan | Baataryn Batbold; Mongolia | Furqatjon Qalandarov; Tajikistan |
| 100 kg | Seýdi Batyrow; Turkmenistan | Baataryn Batbold; Mongolia | Abdollah Eiri; Iran |
| +100 kg | Wepa Orazmuradow; Turkmenistan | Mahmad Mirov; Tajikistan | Annamyrat Myradow; Turkmenistan |
| +100 kg | Wepa Orazmuradow; Turkmenistan | Mahmad Mirov; Tajikistan | Sherzodjon Rakhimov; Uzbekistan |

=== Men's classic style ===
| Event | Gold | Silver | Bronze |
|---|---|---|---|
| 60 kg | Medet Hallygurbanow; Turkmenistan | Erlanbek Murzabekov; Kyrgyzstan | Fayzulla Ummatov; Uzbekistan |
| 60 kg | Medet Hallygurbanow; Turkmenistan | Erlanbek Murzabekov; Kyrgyzstan | Seýitmyrat Ataýew; Turkmenistan |
| 70 kg | Mekangeldi Berdiýew; Turkmenistan | Ilkhomjon Mashrabov; Uzbekistan | Mohammad Gholami; Iran |
| 70 kg | Mekangeldi Berdiýew; Turkmenistan | Ilkhomjon Mashrabov; Uzbekistan | Auyezkhan Kurbankulov; Kazakhstan |
| 80 kg | Esenbek Kudaiberdiev; Kyrgyzstan | Guwanç Ýagmurow; Turkmenistan | Ruslan Tavaldiev; Kyrgyzstan |
| 80 kg | Esenbek Kudaiberdiev; Kyrgyzstan | Guwanç Ýagmurow; Turkmenistan | Ruziboi Safarov; Tajikistan |
| 90 kg | Gylyç Jumaýew; Turkmenistan | Hanmuhammet Patdyýew; Turkmenistan | Abdukakhkhor Egamov; Uzbekistan |
| 90 kg | Gylyç Jumaýew; Turkmenistan | Hanmuhammet Patdyýew; Turkmenistan | Khurshed Sharipov; Tajikistan |
| 100 kg | Seýdi Batyrow; Turkmenistan | Islomjon Kuldashev; Uzbekistan | Mahmoud Parvaneh; Iran |
| 100 kg | Seýdi Batyrow; Turkmenistan | Islomjon Kuldashev; Uzbekistan | Kerim Gurbanow; Turkmenistan |
| +100 kg | Jepbar Atamämmedow; Turkmenistan | Asylbek Khalmatov; Kyrgyzstan | Abdolvahed Mohammadi; Iran |
| +100 kg | Jepbar Atamämmedow; Turkmenistan | Asylbek Khalmatov; Kyrgyzstan | Mahmad Mirov; Tajikistan |

=== Women's freestyle ===
| Event | Gold | Silver | Bronze |
|---|---|---|---|
| 55 kg | Manzuraoy Muydinova; Uzbekistan | Merjen Inatyllaýewa; Turkmenistan | Anara Ryskulova; Kyrgyzstan |
| 55 kg | Manzuraoy Muydinova; Uzbekistan | Merjen Inatyllaýewa; Turkmenistan | Dian Putri Rahmaniah; Indonesia |
| 60 kg | Meerim Momunova; Kyrgyzstan | Zarina Abdyrahmanowa; Turkmenistan | Ambreen Masih; Pakistan |
| 60 kg | Meerim Momunova; Kyrgyzstan | Zarina Abdyrahmanowa; Turkmenistan | Ulzhan Dyussembayeva; Kazakhstan |
| 65 kg | None awarded | None awarded | Leila Salarvand; Iran |
| 65 kg | None awarded | None awarded | None awarded |
| 70 kg | Perizat Zhakypbekova; Kazakhstan | Rano Uzakowa; Turkmenistan | Saodat Işmuradowa; Turkmenistan |
| 70 kg | Perizat Zhakypbekova; Kazakhstan | Rano Uzakowa; Turkmenistan | Gulmira Ismatova; Uzbekistan |
| 75 kg | None awarded | Jahan Muhammedowa; Turkmenistan | Maryam Ahmadi; Iran |
| 75 kg | None awarded | Jahan Muhammedowa; Turkmenistan | Ridha Wahdaniyati; Indonesia |
| +75 kg | Otgony Mönkhtsetseg; Mongolia | Maksuda Egemberdiýewa; Turkmenistan | Saeideh Rahimi; Iran |
| +75 kg | Otgony Mönkhtsetseg; Mongolia | Maksuda Egemberdiýewa; Turkmenistan | Sakhobat Sheralieva; Uzbekistan |

=== Women's classic style ===
| Event | Gold | Silver | Bronze |
|---|---|---|---|
| 55 kg | Zahra Yazdani; Iran | Manzuraoy Muydinova; Uzbekistan | Hesel Bekiýewa; Turkmenistan |
| 55 kg | Zahra Yazdani; Iran | Manzuraoy Muydinova; Uzbekistan | Laçyn Badaglyýewa; Turkmenistan |
| 60 kg | Zuhra Madraimowa; Turkmenistan | Gulkhumoroy Dadaboeva; Uzbekistan | Reihaneh Sheikhian; Iran |
| 60 kg | Zuhra Madraimowa; Turkmenistan | Gulkhumoroy Dadaboeva; Uzbekistan | Zarina Abdyrahmanowa; Turkmenistan |
| 65 kg | None awarded | Dilafruz Mamadjonova; Uzbekistan | Sahar Ghanizadeh; Iran |
| 65 kg | None awarded | Dilafruz Mamadjonova; Uzbekistan | None awarded |
| 70 kg | Nurzat Baktyiar Kyzy; Kyrgyzstan | Rano Uzakowa; Turkmenistan | Divya Guruling Shilwant; India |
| 70 kg | Nurzat Baktyiar Kyzy; Kyrgyzstan | Rano Uzakowa; Turkmenistan | Mönkh-Erdeniin Bayartuul; Mongolia |
| 75 kg | Altynai Mamarasul Kyzy; Kyrgyzstan | Elaheh Rezaei; Iran | Pratiksha Chandrakant Parhar; India |
| 75 kg | Altynai Mamarasul Kyzy; Kyrgyzstan | Elaheh Rezaei; Iran | Jahan Muhammedowa; Turkmenistan |
| +75 kg | Leýli Durnazarowa; Turkmenistan | Otgony Mönkhtsetseg; Mongolia | Asieh Shojaei; Iran |
| +75 kg | Leýli Durnazarowa; Turkmenistan | Otgony Mönkhtsetseg; Mongolia | Maksuda Egemberdiýewa; Turkmenistan |

== Medal table ==
| Rank | Nation | Gold | Silver | Bronze | Total |
|---|---|---|---|---|---|
| 1 | Turkmenistan (TKM) | 13 | 8 | 11 | 32 |
| 2 | Kyrgyzstan (KGZ) | 4 | 3 | 3 | 10 |
| 3 | Uzbekistan (UZB) | 1 | 5 | 8 | 14 |
| 4 | Mongolia (MGL) | 1 | 2 | 1 | 4 |
| 5 | Iran (IRI) | 1 | 1 | 10 | 12 |
| 6 | Kazakhstan (KAZ) | 1 | 0 | 2 | 3 |
| 7 | Tajikistan (TJK) | 0 | 4 | 6 | 10 |
| 8 | India (IND) | 0 | 0 | 2 | 2 |
| 8 | Indonesia (INA) | 0 | 0 | 2 | 2 |
| 10 | Pakistan (PAK) | 0 | 0 | 1 | 1 |
| Totals (10 entries) | | 21 | 23 | 46 | 90 |

== Results ==
=== Men's freestyle ===
==== 60 kg ====
22 September

1/8 finals
Abdurasul Khabibullaev (UZB) | 6
Didar Satbayev (KAZ) | 0
Alvin Lobreguito (PHI)
Ezizmyrat Öwezgeldiýew (TKM) | Fall
Mohsin Ali (PAK)
Fayzulla Ummatov (UZB) | Fall
Ibodullo Aliberdizoda (TJK) | Fall
Rana Muhammad Adnan (PAK)

Quarterfinals
Tirkişgeldi Aýazow (TKM) | 7
Nurlan Sadyraly Uulu (KGZ) | 1
Mehrzod Sufiev (TJK) | 5
Teppei Hatano (JPN) | 0
Abdurasul Khabibullaev (UZB) | Fall
Ezizmyrat Öwezgeldiýew (TKM)
Fayzulla Ummatov (UZB)
Ibodullo Aliberdizoda (TJK) | Fall

Semifinals
Tirkişgeldi Aýazow (TKM) | 3C
Mehrzod Sufiev (TJK)
Abdurasul Khabibullaev (UZB) | 2
Ibodullo Aliberdizoda (TJK) | 7

Final
Tirkişgeldi Aýazow (TKM) | Fall
Ibodullo Aliberdizoda (TJK)

==== 70 kg ====
22 September

1/8 finals
Mukhammadrizvon Azizi (TJK)
Madaminbek Sharshenaly Uulu (KGZ) | WO
Tatsuma Kurosaki (JPN)
Irlan Kazbek Uulu (KGZ) | WO
Paul Dickinson (IND)
Behruz Gulmahmadzoda (TJK) | Fall
Shahzad Khan (PAK) | Fall
Romen Singh Tongbram (IND)
Danish Rasheed (PAK)
Nasir Ahmad Akrami (AFG) | Fall
Jangeldi Medow (TKM) | Fall
Mohammad Gholami (IRI)

Quarterfinals
Dauren Damen (KAZ) | 2
Hangeldi Allakow (TKM) | 7
Madaminbek Sharshenaly Uulu (KGZ) | WD
Irlan Kazbek Uulu (KGZ)
Behruz Gulmahmadzoda (TJK) | 3C
Shahzad Khan (PAK)
Nasir Ahmad Akrami (AFG)
Jangeldi Medow (TKM) | Fall

Semifinals
Hangeldi Allakow (TKM) | 6
Madaminbek Sharshenaly Uulu (KGZ) | 2
Behruz Gulmahmadzoda (TJK) | 6
Jangeldi Medow (TKM) | 0

Final
Hangeldi Allakow (TKM) | 6
Behruz Gulmahmadzoda (TJK) | 1

==== 80 kg ====
22 September

1/8 finals
Giyosiddin Rajabzoda (TJK) | 4
Hadi Salimi (IRI) | 1
Muhammad Asad Butt (PAK) | 2
Ruziboi Safarov (TJK) | 6
Daisuke Fukagawa (JPN)
Zhanybek Allakulov (KGZ) | Fall
Nasimshah Sakhizada (AFG) | 0
Garmämmet Şamämmedow (TKM) | 2
Aly Allaberdiýew (TKM) | Fall
Venuzo Dawhuo (IND)
Ayan Sinha (IND)
Qamar Abbas (PAK) | Fall

Quarterfinals
Jefferson Manatad (PHI)
Eldor Nematov (UZB) | Fall
Giyosiddin Rajabzoda (TJK) | Fall
Ruziboi Safarov (TJK)
Zhanybek Allakulov (KGZ) | 1
Garmämmet Şamämmedow (TKM) | 1
Aly Allaberdiýew (TKM) | Fall
Qamar Abbas (PAK)

Semifinals
Eldor Nematov (UZB)
Giyosiddin Rajabzoda (TJK) | Fall
Garmämmet Şamämmedow (TKM) | 4
Aly Allaberdiýew (TKM) | 0

Final
Giyosiddin Rajabzoda (TJK) | 0
Garmämmet Şamämmedow (TKM) | 2

==== 90 kg ====
22 September

1/8 finals
Christof Hofmann (PHI) | 0
Abdukakhkhor Egamov (UZB) | 6
Visevo Zashumo (IND)
Khurshed Sharipov (TJK) | Fall
Keduovilie Zumu (IND)
Arslan Ybraýymgulyýew (TKM) | Fall
Yersultan Muzapparov (KAZ) | Fall
Kairat Mamatzakirov (KGZ)
Obidali Mavlonov (UZB) | Fall
Davoud Avazzadeh (IRI)
Agung Mulyana (INA)
Aidos Kulmanbetov (KAZ) | Fall

Quarterfinals
Nurbek Kozhobekov (KGZ) | 6
Nurmyrat Mämmetdurdyýew (TKM) | 0
Abdukakhkhor Egamov (UZB) | 0
Khurshed Sharipov (TJK) | 6
Arslan Ybraýymgulyýew (TKM) | 7
Yersultan Muzapparov (KAZ) | 0
Obidali Mavlonov (UZB) | Fall
Aidos Kulmanbetov (KAZ)

Semifinals
Nurbek Kozhobekov (KGZ) | Fall
Khurshed Sharipov (TJK)
Arslan Ybraýymgulyýew (TKM) | Fall
Obidali Mavlonov (UZB)

Final
Nurbek Kozhobekov (KGZ) | 0
Arslan Ybraýymgulyýew (TKM) | 3

==== 100 kg ====
22 September

1/8 finals
Dilovar Gulov (TJK)
Şyhmyrat Durdyýew (TKM) | Fall
Kadyr Kelsinbekov (KGZ) | 0
Seýdi Batyrow (TKM) | 3

Quarterfinals
Furqatjon Qalandarov (TJK) | Fall
Islomjon Kuldashev (UZB)
Baataryn Batbold (MGL) | 3C
Surhoneyi Soho (IND)
Abdollah Eiri (IRI) | 6
Nazir Ahmad Karimi (AFG) | 1
Şyhmyrat Durdyýew (TKM)
Seýdi Batyrow (TKM) | Fall

Semifinals
Furqatjon Qalandarov (TJK) | 0
Baataryn Batbold (MGL) | 6
Abdollah Eiri (IRI)
Seýdi Batyrow (TKM) | Fall

Final
Baataryn Batbold (MGL)
Seýdi Batyrow (TKM) | Fall

==== +100 kg ====
22 September

1/8 finals
Abdolvahed Mohammadi (IRI) | Fall
Edi Sudrajat (INA)
Mahmad Mirov (TJK) | Fall
Menuosetuo Yiese (IND)

Quarterfinals
Wepa Orazmuradow (TKM) | Fall
Odiljon Suyunov (UZB)
Zaman Anwar (PAK)
Annamyrat Myradow (TKM) | Fall
Sherzodjon Rakhimov (UZB) | Fall
Gongoryn Pürevbaatar (MGL)
Abdolvahed Mohammadi (IRI)
Mahmad Mirov (TJK) | Fall

Semifinals
Wepa Orazmuradow (TKM) | Fall
Annamyrat Myradow (TKM)
Sherzodjon Rakhimov (UZB)
Mahmad Mirov (TJK) | Fall

Final
Wepa Orazmuradow (TKM) | 0
Mahmad Mirov (TJK) | 0

=== Men's classic style ===
==== 60 kg ====
23 September

1/8 finals
Berikbol Muratkhan (KAZ)
Enkhtaivany Enkhbold (MGL) | Fall
Erlanbek Murzabekov (KGZ) | 6
Abdurasul Khabibullaev (UZB) | 2

Quarterfinals
Medet Hallygurbanow (TKM) | Fall
Santikumar Singh (IND)
Fayzulla Ummatov (UZB) | 6
Ghasem Norouzi (IRI) | 3
Mehrzod Sufiev (TJK) | 1
Seýitmyrat Ataýew (TKM) | 5
Enkhtaivany Enkhbold (MGL)
Erlanbek Murzabekov (KGZ) | Fall

Semifinals
Medet Hallygurbanow (TKM) | Fall
Fayzulla Ummatov (UZB)
Seýitmyrat Ataýew (TKM)
Erlanbek Murzabekov (KGZ) | Fall

Final
Medet Hallygurbanow (TKM) | DQ
Erlanbek Murzabekov (KGZ)

==== 70 kg ====
23 September

1/8 finals
Paul Dickinson (IND)
Mekangeldi Berdiýew (TKM) | Fall
Shakhobiddin Sangilov (UZB) | 2
Mukhammadrizvon Azizi (TJK) | 2

Quarterfinals
Ruslan Taganow (TKM) | 1
Mohammad Gholami (IRI) | 2
Nasir Ahmad Akrami (AFG) | 1
Ilkhomjon Mashrabov (UZB) | 6
Irlan Kazbek Uulu (KGZ)
Auyezkhan Kurbankulov (KAZ) | DQ
Mekangeldi Berdiýew (TKM) | Fall
Mukhammadrizvon Azizi (TJK)

Semifinals
Mohammad Gholami (IRI) | 1
Ilkhomjon Mashrabov (UZB) | 7
Auyezkhan Kurbankulov (KAZ)
Mekangeldi Berdiýew (TKM) | 3C

Final
Ilkhomjon Mashrabov (UZB)
Mekangeldi Berdiýew (TKM) | Fall

==== 80 kg ====
23 September

1/8 finals
Nasimshah Sakhizada (AFG) | 0
Hadi Salimi (IRI) | 1

Quarterfinals
Guwanç Ýagmurow (TKM) | 4
Giyosiddin Rajabzoda (TJK) | 0
Ruslan Tavaldiev (KGZ) | Fall
Jefferson Manatad (PHI)
Halnepes Şagulyýew (TKM) | 4
Ruziboi Safarov (TJK) | 4
Esenbek Kudaiberdiev (KGZ) | 2
Hadi Salimi (IRI) | 0

Semifinals
Guwanç Ýagmurow (TKM) | Fall
Ruslan Tavaldiev (KGZ)
Ruziboi Safarov (TJK) | 0
Esenbek Kudaiberdiev (KGZ) | 3

Final
Guwanç Ýagmurow (TKM)
Esenbek Kudaiberdiev (KGZ) | Fall

==== 90 kg ====
23 September

1/8 finals
Aidos Kulmanbetov (KAZ) | 0
Khurshed Sharipov (TJK) | 6
Sherikbai Amanilla Uulu (KGZ) | 7
Hamed Mirzapour (IRI) | 1
Husniddin Toshmurotov (TJK) | 0
Hanmuhammet Patdyýew (TKM) | 5
Kairat Mamatzakirov (KGZ) | Fall
Sudhir Pundekar (IND)

Quarterfinals
Abdukakhkhor Egamov (UZB) | 7
Jaydev Mhamane (IND) | 0
Gylyç Jumaýew (TKM) | Fall
Christof Hofmann (PHI)
Khurshed Sharipov (TJK) | 2
Sherikbai Amanilla Uulu (KGZ) | 0
Hanmuhammet Patdyýew (TKM) | 4
Kairat Mamatzakirov (KGZ) | 0

Semifinals
Abdukakhkhor Egamov (UZB)
Gylyç Jumaýew (TKM) | Fall
Khurshed Sharipov (TJK) | 0
Hanmuhammet Patdyýew (TKM) | 5

Final
Gylyç Jumaýew (TKM) | 2
Hanmuhammet Patdyýew (TKM) | 0

==== 100 kg ====
23 September

1/8 finals
Swapnil Balu Phule (IND)
Seýdi Batyrow (TKM) | Fall
Kerim Gurbanow (TKM) | 6
Dilovar Gulov (TJK) | 0
Furqatjon Qalandarov (TJK) | 3C
Baataryn Batbold (MGL)

Quarterfinals
Islomjon Kuldashev (UZB) | 1
Nurbek Akanov (KGZ) | 0
Atul Vasant Ghule (IND)
Mahmoud Parvaneh (IRI) | WO
Orozbek Ashirov (KGZ) | 0
Seýdi Batyrow (TKM) | 5
Kerim Gurbanow (TKM) | 3
Furqatjon Qalandarov (TJK) | 1

Semifinals
Islomjon Kuldashev (UZB) | 0
Mahmoud Parvaneh (IRI) | 0
Seýdi Batyrow (TKM) | 4
Kerim Gurbanow (TKM) | 0

Final
Islomjon Kuldashev (UZB)
Seýdi Batyrow (TKM) | Fall

==== +100 kg ====
23 September

1/8 finals
Asylbek Khalmatov (KGZ) | 5
Vechita Khesoh (IND) | 0

Quarterfinals
Sherzodjon Rakhimov (UZB) | 0
Jepbar Atamämmedow (TKM) | 5
Abdolvahed Mohammadi (IRI) | 5
Gongoryn Pürevbaatar (MGL) | 0
Mahmad Mirov (TJK) | 6
Odiljon Suyunov (UZB) | 0
Edi Sudrajat (INA)
Asylbek Khalmatov (KGZ) | Fall

Semifinals
Jepbar Atamämmedow (TKM) | 6
Abdolvahed Mohammadi (IRI) | 0
Mahmad Mirov (TJK) | 0
Asylbek Khalmatov (KGZ) | 0

Final
Jepbar Atamämmedow (TKM) | Fall
Asylbek Khalmatov (KGZ)

=== Women's freestyle ===
==== 55 kg ====
22 September

1/8 finals
Zahra Yazdani (IRI)
Dian Putri Rahmaniah (INA) | Fall
Laçyn Badaglyýewa (TKM) | Fall
Shamal Sunil Belgaonkar (IND)
Humaira Ashiq (PAK) | 1
Manzuraoy Muydinova (UZB) | 4

Quarterfinals
Pallavi Bhat (IND)
Anara Ryskulova (KGZ) | Fall
Merjen Inatyllaýewa (TKM) | 1
Botagoz Dyussembayeva (KAZ) | 1
Grace Loberanes (PHI) | 0
Dian Putri Rahmaniah (INA) | 6
Laçyn Badaglyýewa (TKM)
Manzuraoy Muydinova (UZB) | Fall

Semifinals
Anara Ryskulova (KGZ) | 3
Merjen Inatyllaýewa (TKM) | 5
Dian Putri Rahmaniah (INA)
Manzuraoy Muydinova (UZB) | Fall

Final
Merjen Inatyllaýewa (TKM) | 2
Manzuraoy Muydinova (UZB) | 2

==== 60 kg ====
22 September

Quarterfinals
Zarina Abdyrahmanowa (TKM) | Fall
Zahra Mahmoudi (IRI)
Meerim Momunova (KGZ) | DQ
Zuhra Madraimowa (TKM)
Noemi Tener (PHI)
Ulzhan Dyussembayeva (KAZ) | Fall

Semifinals
Ambreen Masih (PAK) | 2
Zarina Abdyrahmanowa (TKM) | 6
Meerim Momunova (KGZ) | 2
Ulzhan Dyussembayeva (KAZ) | 0

Final
Zarina Abdyrahmanowa (TKM) | 0
Meerim Momunova (KGZ) | 3

==== 65 kg ====
22 September

| Pos | Athlete | Pld | W | L | CP | IRI | UZB | KGZ | TKM | TKM |
|---|---|---|---|---|---|---|---|---|---|---|
| 3 | Leila Salarvand (IRI) | 4 | 2 | 2 | 9 | — | WO | 6–2 | Fall | Fall |
| 4 | Dilafruz Mamadjonova (UZB) | 4 | 1 | 3 | 6 | 0–5 VD | — | Fall | WO | 2–5 |
| 5 | Kumushai Attokur Kyzy (KGZ) | 4 | 0 | 4 | 2 | 1–4 VO | 0–5 VF | — | Fall | 1–6 |
| DQ | Gülnar Haýytbaýewa (TKM) | 4 | 4 | 0 | 19 | 5–0 VF | 5–0 VN | 5–0 VF | — | 6–0 |
| DQ | Dinara Hallyýewa (TKM) | 4 | 3 | 1 | 12 | 5–0 VF | 3–1 VQ | 4–1 VO | 0–4 VP | — |

Source: Official website
- Gülnar Haýytbaýewa of Turkmenistan originally won the gold medal, but was disqualified after she tested positive for Methylhexaneamine and 1,3-Dimethylbutylamine.
- Dinara Hallyýewa of Turkmenistan originally won the silver medal, but was disqualified after she tested positive for Meldonium.

==== 70 kg ====
22 September

1/8 finals
Zahra Majdi (IRI)
Gulmira Ismatova (UZB) | Fall

Quarterfinals
Saodat Işmuradowa (TKM) | Fall
Anita Dwi Nengrum (INA)
Divya Guruling Shilwant (IND)
Perizat Zhakypbekova (KAZ) | Fall
Nurzat Baktyiar Kyzy (KGZ)
Rano Uzakowa (TKM) | Fall
Mönkh-Erdeniin Bayartuul (MGL) | 0
Gulmira Ismatova (UZB) | 2

Semifinals
Saodat Işmuradowa (TKM) | 4
Perizat Zhakypbekova (KAZ) | 5
Rano Uzakowa (TKM) | 5
Gulmira Ismatova (UZB) | 0

Final
Perizat Zhakypbekova (KAZ) | 3
Rano Uzakowa (TKM) | 0

==== 75 kg ====
22 September

Quarterfinals
Pratiksha Chandrakant Parhar (IND) | 0
Jahan Muhammedowa (TKM) | 6
Ridha Wahdaniyati (INA) | Fall
Altynai Mamarasul Kyzy (KGZ)

Semifinals
Maryam Ahmadi (IRI)
Nasiba Surkiýewa (TKM) | Fall
Jahan Muhammedowa (TKM) | 6
Ridha Wahdaniyati (INA) | 0

Final
Nasiba Surkiýewa (TKM) | WO
Jahan Muhammedowa (TKM)

- Nasiba Surkiýewa of Turkmenistan originally won the gold medal, but was disqualified after she tested positive for Methylhexaneamine and 1,3-Dimethylbutylamine.

==== +75 kg ====
22 September

Quarterfinals
Leýli Durnazarowa (TKM)
Saeideh Rahimi (IRI) | Fall
Nazira Arzybekova (KGZ) | 2
Maksuda Egemberdiýewa (TKM) | 2
Ganboldyn Sarangoo (MGL) | 1
Sakhobat Sheralieva (UZB) | 1

Semifinals
Otgony Mönkhtsetseg (MGL) | 6
Saeideh Rahimi (IRI) | 0
Maksuda Egemberdiýewa (TKM) | 6
Sakhobat Sheralieva (UZB) | 0

Final
Otgony Mönkhtsetseg (MGL) | 4
Maksuda Egemberdiýewa (TKM) | 2

=== Women's classic style ===
==== 55 kg ====
23 September

1/8 finals
Pallavi Bhat (IND)
Laçyn Badaglyýewa (TKM) | Fall
Meerim Miizamidin Kyzy (KGZ) | Fall
Maryam (PAK)

Quarterfinals
Botagoz Dyussembayeva (KAZ) | 1
Hesel Bekiýewa (TKM) | 1
Dian Putri Rahmaniah (INA)
Manzuraoy Muydinova (UZB) | Fall
Grace Loberanes (PHI)
Zahra Yazdani (IRI) | Fall
Laçyn Badaglyýewa (TKM) | 6
Meerim Miizamidin Kyzy (KGZ) | 2

Semifinals
Hesel Bekiýewa (TKM)
Manzuraoy Muydinova (UZB) | Fall
Zahra Yazdani (IRI) | Fall
Laçyn Badaglyýewa (TKM)

Final
Manzuraoy Muydinova (UZB)
Zahra Yazdani (IRI) | Fall

==== 60 kg ====
23 September

Quarterfinals
Reihaneh Sheikhian (IRI) | 7
Noemi Tener (PHI) | 0
Zuhra Madraimowa (TKM) | 3
Ulzhan Dyussembayeva (KAZ) | 0
Meerim Momunova (KGZ) | 1
Gulkhumoroy Dadaboeva (UZB) | 5
Ochirpüreviin Lkhagvakhüü (MGL)
Zarina Abdyrahmanowa (TKM) | DQ

Semifinals
Reihaneh Sheikhian (IRI)
Zuhra Madraimowa (TKM) | Fall
Gulkhumoroy Dadaboeva (UZB) | 6
Zarina Abdyrahmanowa (TKM) | 0

Final
Zuhra Madraimowa (TKM) | 5
Gulkhumoroy Dadaboeva (UZB) | 0

==== 65 kg ====
23 September

| Pos | Athlete | Pld | W | L | CP | UZB | IRI | UZB | KGZ | TKM |
|---|---|---|---|---|---|---|---|---|---|---|
| 2 | Dilafruz Mamadjonova (UZB) | 4 | 3 | 1 | 14 | — | 6–0 | Fall | 3C | 3C |
| 3 | Sahar Ghanizadeh (IRI) | 4 | 2 | 2 | 7 | 0–4 VP | — | 6–0 | 3–2 | 0–4 |
| 4 | Khavaskhon Jurakuzieva (UZB) | 4 | 1 | 3 | 4 | 0–5 VF | 0–4 VP | — | 6–0 | 0–7 |
| 5 | Uulkan Alibai Kyzy (KGZ) | 4 | 0 | 4 | 1 | 0–5 VC | 1–3 VQ | 0–4 VP | — | Fall |
| DQ | Dinara Hallyýewa (TKM) | 4 | 4 | 0 | 17 | 5–0 VC | 3–0 VS | 4–0 VP | 5–0 VF | — |

Source: Official website
- Dinara Hallyýewa of Turkmenistan originally won the gold medal, but was disqualified after she tested positive for Meldonium.

==== 70 kg ====
23 September

Quarterfinals
Nurzat Baktyiar Kyzy (KGZ) | 2
Saodat Işmuradowa (TKM) | 2
Gulmira Ismatova (UZB) | 0
Mönkh-Erdeniin Bayartuul (MGL) | 2
Rano Uzakowa (TKM) | Fall
Anita Dwi Nengrum (INA)

Semifinals
Divya Guruling Shilwant (IND)
Nurzat Baktyiar Kyzy (KGZ) | Fall
Mönkh-Erdeniin Bayartuul (MGL) | 0
Rano Uzakowa (TKM) | 7

Final
Nurzat Baktyiar Kyzy (KGZ) | 3
Rano Uzakowa (TKM) | 2

==== 75 kg ====
23 September

Quarterfinals
Nasiba Surkiýewa (TKM)
Jahan Muhammedowa (TKM) | Fall
Altynai Mamarasul Kyzy (KGZ) | 7
Ridha Wahdaniyati (INA) | 4

Semifinals
Elaheh Rezaei (IRI) | Fall
Pratiksha Chandrakant Parhar (IND)
Jahan Muhammedowa (TKM) | 1
Altynai Mamarasul Kyzy (KGZ) | 2

Final
Elaheh Rezaei (IRI) | 1
Altynai Mamarasul Kyzy (KGZ) | 1

- Nasiba Surkiýewa of Turkmenistan originally finished fifth, but was disqualified after she tested positive for Methylhexaneamine and 1,3-Dimethylbutylamine.

==== +75 kg ====
23 September

Quarterfinals
Sakhobat Sheralieva (UZB)
Asieh Shojaei (IRI) | Fall
Otgony Mönkhtsetseg (MGL) | Fall
Ganboldyn Sarangoo (MGL)
Maksuda Egemberdiýewa (TKM) | Fall
Nazira Arzybekova (KGZ)

Semifinals
Leýli Durnazarowa (TKM) | Fall
Asieh Shojaei (IRI)
Otgony Mönkhtsetseg (MGL) | 4
Maksuda Egemberdiýewa (TKM) | 1

Final
Leýli Durnazarowa (TKM) | 3C
Otgony Mönkhtsetseg (MGL)
