= Swimming at the 2018 Asian Games – Men's 100 metre butterfly =

Men's 100 metre butterfly at the 2018 Asian Games
- Venue: Gelora Bung Karno Aquatic Stadium
- Date: 22 August 2018
- Competitors: 34 from 22 nations

Medalists
| gold medal | Joseph Schooling | Singapore |
| silver medal | Li Zhuhao | China |
| bronze medal | Yuki Kobori | Japan |

The men's 100 metre butterfly event at the 2018 Asian Games took place on 22 August at the Gelora Bung Karno Aquatic Stadium.

== Schedule ==
All times are Western Indonesia Time (UTC+07:00)

| Date | Time | Event |
|---|---|---|
| Wednesday, 22 August 2018 | 09:00 | Heats |
| Wednesday, 22 August 2018 | 18:00 | Final |

== Records ==
Prior to this competition, the existing world, Asian and Games records were as follows.

| World Record | Michael Phelps (USA) | 49.82 | Rome, Italy | 1 August 2009 |
| Asian Record | Joseph Schooling (SIN) | 50.39 | Rio de Janeiro, Brazil | 12 August 2016 |
| Games Record | Joseph Schooling (SIN) | 51.76 | Incheon, South Korea | 24 September 2014 |

== Results ==
Legend

- DNS — Did not start

=== Heats ===
| Rank | Heat | Athlete | Time | Notes |
|---|---|---|---|---|
| 1 | 5 | Joseph Schooling (SGP) | 52.31 | |
| 2 | 3 | Yuki Kobori (JPN) | 52.47 | |
| 3 | 4 | Li Zhuhao (CHN) | 52.50 | |
| 4 | 4 | Quah Zheng Wen (SGP) | 52.76 | |
| 5 | 5 | Adilbek Mussin (KAZ) | 52.99 | |
| 6 | 3 | Chang Gyu-cheol (KOR) | 53.20 | |
| 7 | 3 | Glenn Victor Sutanto (INA) | 53.29 | |
| 8 | 5 | Nao Horomura (JPN) | 53.30 | |
| 9 | 4 | Zheng Xiaojing (CHN) | 53.53 | |
| 10 | 3 | Chu Chen-ping (TPE) | 53.98 | |
| 11 | 5 | Triady Fauzi Sidiq (INA) | 53.99 | |
| 12 | 2 | Sajan Prakash (IND) | 54.06 | |
| 13 | 4 | Chan Jie (MAS) | 54.20 | |
| 14 | 4 | Artyom Kozlyuk (UZB) | 54.57 | |
| 15 | 5 | Nicholas Lim (HKG) | 54.67 | |
| 16 | 3 | Park Jung-hun (KOR) | 54.74 | |
| 17 | 5 | Mehdi Ansari (IRI) | 54.88 | |
| 18 | 3 | Navaphat Wongcharoen (THA) | 54.91 | |
| 18 | 4 | Wang Kuan-hung (TPE) | 54.91 | |
| 20 | 4 | Ho Tin Long (HKG) | 55.05 | |
| 21 | 5 | Vladislav Shuliko (KGZ) | 55.06 | |
| 22 | 3 | Ngô Đình Chuyền (VIE) | 55.97 | |
| 23 | 3 | Alireza Yavari (IRI) | 56.10 | |
| 24 | 5 | Hoàng Quý Phước (VIE) | 56.51 | |
| 25 | 2 | Yacob Al-Khulaifi (QAT) | 56.94 | |
| 26 | 1 | Avinash Mani (IND) | 56.98 | |
| 27 | 1 | Yousif Bu Arish (KSA) | 57.84 | |
| 28 | 2 | Sio Ka Kun (MAC) | 1:00.39 | |
| 29 | 2 | Kawas Behram Aga (PAK) | 1:01.16 | |
| 30 | 2 | Batmönkhiin Jürmed (MGL) | 1:01.33 | |
| 31 | 2 | Lim Keouodom (CAM) | 1:01.47 | |
| — | 1 | Abbas Qali (KUW) | DNS | |
| — | 2 | Erdenemönkhiin Demüül (MGL) | DNS | |
| — | 4 | Noah Al-Khulaifi (QAT) | DNS | |

=== Final ===
| Rank | Athlete | Time | Notes |
|---|---|---|---|
| 1st place, gold medalist(s) | Joseph Schooling (SGP) | 51.04 | GR |
| 2nd place, silver medalist(s) | Li Zhuhao (CHN) | 51.46 | |
| 3rd place, bronze medalist(s) | Yuki Kobori (JPN) | 51.77 | |
| 4 | Quah Zheng Wen (SGP) | 52.54 | |
| 5 | Adilbek Mussin (KAZ) | 52.95 | |
| 6 | Nao Horomura (JPN) | 53.00 | |
| 7 | Chang Gyu-cheol (KOR) | 53.32 | |
| 8 | Glenn Victor Sutanto (INA) | 53.89 | |
