= Masoud Abdolmaleki =

Iranian MuayThai Kickboxer (born 1990)

- Born: Masoud Abdolmaleki; 30 October 1990 (age 35); Tehran, Iran
- Native name: مسعود عبدالمالکی
- Nationality: Iranian; New Zealander
- Height: 178 cm (5 ft 10 in)
- Weight: 63.5 kg (140 lb; 10 st 0 lb)
- Division: Bantamweight
- Style: Muay Thai, Kickboxing
- Fighting out of: Auckland, New Zealand
- Years active: 2005-present

Masoud Abdolmaleki (Persian: مسعود عبدالمالکی, born 30 October 1990 in Tehran) is an Iranian New Zealand Muay Thai Kickboxer. He has won gold medals in the 2008, 2010 and 2022 International Federation of Muaythai Associations (IFMA). Abdolmaleki won gold medals in the 2016 World Muaythai Federation and 2023 World Combat Games.

== Championships and awards ==
- International Federation of Muaythai Associations
  - (gold) 2008 IFMA Youth World Championship
  - (gold) 2010 IFMA World Championship
  - (gold) 2022 IFMA World Championship
  - (gold) 2023 World Combat Games
- World Muaythai Federation
  - (gold) 2016 WMF World Championship

== See also ==
- Muaythai at the 2017 Asian Indoor and Martial Arts Games
- Iran at the 2017 Asian Indoor and Martial Arts Games
- 2019 in Wu Lin Feng
