= Ýaňyl Kawisowa =

Turkmenistan female Muaythai fighter

- Born: January 1, 1997 (age 29); Dashoguz, Turkmenistan

Ýaňyl Kawisowa (born 1 January 1997) is a Turkmenistan female Muaythai practitioner. She was also a karate practitioner (karateka) before becoming a professional Muay Thai practitioner.

Ýaňyl competed at the 2016 Asian Beach Games and clinched a bronze medal in the women's 54–57 kg featherweight event. In the same year, she took part in the IFMA Muay Thai World Cup and secured a silver medal in the women's featherweight event. Ýaňyl Kawisowa represented Turkmenistan at the 2017 Asian Indoor and Martial Arts Games and claimed a silver medal in the women's 54 kg event and eventually Turkmenistan was placed first according to the number of medals at the multi-sport event.
