= Pakistan at the 2017 Asian Indoor and Martial Arts Games =

- IOC code: PAK
- NOC: Pakistan Olympic Committee

in Ashgabat 17–27 September
- Competitors: 107 in 11 sports
- Medals Ranked 22nd: Gold 2 Silver 3 Bronze 16 Total 21

Asian Indoor and Martial Arts Games appearances
- 2005; 2007; 2009; 2013; 2017; 2021; 2026

Pakistan competed at the 2017 Asian Indoor and Martial Arts Games held in Ashgabat, Turkmenistan from September 17 to 27. 107 athletes competed in 11 different sports.

== Participants ==
Sport	Men	Women	Total
Belt wrestling	20	4	24
Cue sports	3	0	3
Indoor athletics	7	4	11
Ju-jitsu	9	4	13
Kickboxing	7	0	7
Short course swimming	4	4	8
Taekwondo	5	2	7
Tennis	3	3	6
Turkmen goresh	15	4	19
Weightlifting	3	0	3
Wrestling	6	0	6
Total	82	25	107

== Medallists ==
Medal	Name	Sport	Event
Gold	Asad Iqbal	Indoor athletics	Men's 4 × 400 metres relay
Gold	Mehboob Ali	Indoor athletics	Men's 4 × 400 metres relay
Gold	Nishat Ali	Indoor athletics	Men's 4 × 400 metres relay
Gold	Nokar Hussain	Indoor athletics	Men's 4 × 400 metres relay
Gold	Rafique Siddique	Ju-jitsu	Men's duo show
Gold	Shahzeb Nawaz Janjua	Ju-jitsu	Men's duo show
Silver	Muhammad Adnan	Belt wrestling	Men's Pahlavani - 90 kg
Silver	Abu Hurrara	Ju-jitsu	Men's duo classic
Silver	Muhammad Ammar	Ju-jitsu	Men's duo classic
Silver	Komal Emmanuel	Ju-jitsu	Mixed duo show
Silver	Rafique Siddique	Ju-jitsu	Mixed duo show
Bronze	Muhammad Safdar	Belt wrestling	Men's Classic style - 65 kg
Bronze	Muhammad Basit	Belt wrestling	Men's Freestyle +100 kg
Bronze	Ambreen Masih	Belt wrestling	Women's Alysh Free - 60 kg
Bronze	Humaira Ashiq	Belt wrestling	Women's Classic style - 50 kg
Bronze	Ambreen Masih	Belt wrestling	Women's Classic style - 55 kg
Bronze	Beenish Khan	Belt wrestling	Women's Classic style - 70 kg
Bronze	Maryam	Belt wrestling	Women's Freestyle - 50 kg
Bronze	Beenish Khan	Belt wrestling	Women's Freestyle - 70 kg
Bronze	Muhammad Sajjad	Cue sports	Men's 6-Red Snooker singles
Bronze	Jahanzeb Rashad Lone	Ju-jitsu	Men's Ne-Waza - 56 kg
Bronze	Komal Emmanuel	Ju-jitsu	Women's duo classic
Bronze	Sonia Manzoor	Ju-jitsu	Women's duo classic
Bronze	Komal Emmanuel	Ju-jitsu	Women's duo show
Bronze	Sonia Manzoor	Ju-jitsu	Women's duo show
Bronze	Sonia Manzoor	Ju-jitsu	Mixed duo classic
Bronze	Shahzeb Nawaz Janjua	Ju-jitsu	Mixed duo classic
Bronze	Maaz Khan	Kickboxing	Men's Full contact - 75 kg
Bronze	Muhammad Saeed Anwar	Turkmen goresh	Men's Classic style - 57 kg
Bronze	Ambreen Masih	Turkmen goresh	Women's Classic style - 58 kg

=== Multiple medallists ===
The following competitors won several medals at the 2017 Asian Indoor and Martial Arts Games.

Name	Medal	Sport	Event
Rafique Siddique	Gold; Silver	Ju-jitsu	Men's duo show Mixed duo show
Shahzeb Nawaz Janjua	Gold; Bronze	Ju-jitsu	Men's duo show Mixed duo classic
Komal Emmanuel	Silver; Bronze; Bronze	Ju-jitsu	Mixed duo show Women's duo classic Women's duo show
Sonia Manzoor	Bronze; Bronze; Bronze	Ju-jitsu	Women's duo classic Women's duo show Mixed duo classic
Ambreen Masih	Bronze; Bronze; Bronze	Belt wrestling Turkmen goresh	Women's Alysh Free - 60 kg Women's Classic style - 55 kg Women's Classic style - 58 kg
Beenish Khan	Bronze; Bronze	Belt wrestling	Women's Classic style - 70 kg Women's Freestyle - 70 kg
