= Alireza Yavari =

Iranian swimmer (born 2000)

Personal information
- Full name: Alireza Yavari Foroushani
- Nationality: Iranian
- Born: May 4, 2000 (age 26) Esfahan, Iran
- Height: 1.77 m (5 ft 10 in)
- Weight: 171 lb (78 kg)

Sport
- Sport: Swimming
Medal record
Men's swimming
Representing Iran
Islamic Solidarity Games
| Bronze medal – third place | 2021 Konya | 4×100 m freestyle |

Alireza Yavari Foroushani (Persian: علیرضا یاوری فروشانی; born May 4, 2000) is an Iranian swimmer whose specialty is butterfly and freestyle events. He competed in the men's 100 metre butterfly and men's 200 metre Freestyle events at the Swimming at the 2018 Asian Games and at the 2019 World Aquatics Championships.

== Sports career ==
Yavari made his senior competition debut at the 2019 World Championships in Gwangju, Korea where he competed in two events. First, in the 200 freestyle, he took the 58th place in the qualification, and then in the 100 butterfly, he took the 51st position in the competition of 78 swimmers.
