= Phillip Delarmino =

Filipino Muay Thai fighter (born 1990)

- Born: November 9, 1990 (age 35)
- Other names: The Destroyer
- Nationality: Filipino

Phillip Deploma Delarmino (born November 9, 1990) is a Filipino Muay Thai fighter who is a gold medalist in the 2021 IFMA World Muaythai Championships.

== Early life ==
A native of Dumangas, Iloilo, Phillip Delarmino's family lived in poverty. His father worked as pedicab driver until the patriarch became blind due to diabetes. Phillip would resorted to scavenging as a means to earn money to support his education. He also experienced being a street urchin.

== Career ==
Delarmino would later take up Muay Thai and would be known under the moniker "The Destroyer". He and his sibling would frequent a gymnasium. Due to lack of funds to pay an instructor to teach them, he and his sibling would just watch sessions and would just imitate what they observed. They would join competitions at the local fiesta. His career took off, when he won a national championship at age 16. He and his siblings, Leonard and Agustin would also fight in the Universal Reality Combat Championship (URCC).

He became part of the Philippine national team in 2012. His first stint in the Southeast Asian (SEA) Games was in the 2013 edition where he finished as a silver medalist. He would take part in the 2014 Asian Beach Games in Thailand where he won another silver.

Muay Thai would return to the SEA Games in the 2017 edition. Delarmino joined but was only able to reach the quarterfinals of his event. At the 2017 Asian Indoor and Martial Arts Games in Ashgabat, Turkmenistan, Delarmino had another silver medal finish after losing to Chotichanin Kokkrachai in the final.

Delarmino would earn a bronze medal at the 2018 IFMA World Muaythai Championships Mexico in a Competitive B event. However, he just ended fifth place in the succeeding 2019 edition held in Thailand.

He would return again for the SEA Games in the 2019 edition, his third time. He would win his first-ever SEA Games gold medal in the tournament hosted at home.

Delarmino won the gold medal for the 57 kg senior elite male category of the 2021 IFMA World Muaythai Championships in Phuket, Thailand. This is his first-ever world title.

In the 2021 SEA Games, which was postponed to 2022 due to the COVID-19 pandemic, Delarmino settled for silver after his opponent Nguyễn Doãn Long was judged to be the winner in the highly disputed match. He would file a successful protest and he was ruled to be the winner after a review.

He would compete in the 2021 World Games in Birmingham after qualifying through his feat in the Muaythai Championships. However he failed to secure at least a podium finish after losing to Vladislav Mykytas of Ukraine in his opening match. He would be the first-ever Filipino to be nominated for the 2021 World Games Athletic of the Year, an honor that would be bestowed to India's P. R. Sreejesh.

Delarmino would compete again in the Southeast Asian Games' 2023 edition in Cambodia, this time in kun bokator. He settled for bronze in the men's combat 60 kg category.

== Personal life ==
Delarmino is an enlisted personnel for the Philippine Navy and have the rank of Seaman 2nd Class as of June 2022. He is also a taekwondo practitioner, competing for the navy under the said discipline.
