= Mehdi Ansari =

Iranian swimmer

Mehdi Ansari مهدی انصاری
Personal information
- Born: 29 October 1994 (age 31)

Sport
- Sport: Swimming

Mehdi Ansari (Persian: مهدی انصاری; born 29 October 1994) is an Iranian swimmer. He competed in the men's 50 metre butterfly and men's 100 metre butterfly events at the 2017 World Aquatics Championships.
