= Singapore at the 2017 Asian Indoor and Martial Arts Games =

- IOC code: SGP
- NOC: Singapore National Olympic Council
- Website: www.singaporeolympics.com

in Ashgabat 17–27 September
- Competitors: 8 in 3 sports
- Medals: Gold 0 Silver 0 Bronze 1 Total 1

Asian Indoor and Martial Arts Games appearances
- 2005; 2007; 2009; 2013; 2017; 2021; 2025

Singapore competed at the 2017 Asian Indoor and Martial Arts Games held in Ashgabat, Turkmenistan from September 17 to 27. Singapore sent 8 competitors for the multi-sport event. Singapore clinched its only medal in the Muay Thai women's 54kg event.

== Participants ==
Sport	Men	Women	Total
Belt wrestling	1	0	1
Chess	0	1	1
Dancesport	1	1	2
Muaythai	0	1	1
Wrestling	2	1	3

== Medallists ==
Medal	Name	Sport	Event
Bronze	Gwa Wei Ying	MuayThai	women's 51kg
