= Kyrgyzstan at the 2017 Asian Indoor and Martial Arts Games =

- IOC code: KGZ
- NOC: National Olympic Committee of the Kyrgyzstan

in Ashgabat 17–27 September
- Competitors: 153 in 16 sports
- Medals Ranked 8th: Gold 13 Silver 20 Bronze 37 Total 70

Asian Indoor and Martial Arts Games appearances
- 2005; 2007; 2009; 2013; 2017; 2021; 2026

Kyrgyzstan competed at the 2017 Asian Indoor and Martial Arts Games held in Ashgabat, Turkmenistan from September 17 to 27. 158 athletes competed in 16 different sports.

== Participants ==
Sport	Men	Women	Total
3x3 basketball	3	0	3
Belt wrestling	24	8	32
Chess	2	2	4
Cue sports	5	0	5
Dancesport	1	1	2
Equestrian	4	0	4
Futsal	12	0	12
Indoor athletics	3	2	5
Ju-jitsu	9	0	9
Kickboxing	11	2	13
Muay Thai	4	0	4
Sambo	24	1	25
Short course swimming	2	0	2
Taekwondo	2	0	2
Turkmen goresh	10	6	16
Wrestling	15	5	20
Total	131	27	158

== Medallists ==
Medal	Name	Sport	Event
Gold	Esenbek Kudaiberdiev	Belt wrestling	Men's Alysh Classic - 80 kg
Gold	Bekzat Tynchtykbek Uulu	Belt wrestling	Men's Classic style - 55 kg
Gold	Nurzat Baktyiar Kyzy	Belt wrestling	Women's Alysh Classic - 70 kg
Gold	Altynai Mamarasul Kyzy	Belt wrestling	Women's Alysh Classic - 75 kg
Gold	Meerim Momunova	Belt wrestling	Women's Alysh Freestyle - 60 kg
Gold	Yzatbek Ratbekov	Cue sports	Men's Russian pyramid combined singles
Gold	Tatiana Kogadei	Dancesport	Samba
Gold	Aleksei Kibkalo	Dancesport	Samba
Gold	Abdurahmanhaji Murtazaliev	Ju-jitsu	Men's Ne-Waza - 85 kg
Gold	Avazbek Amanbekov	Kickboxing	Men's Full contact - 57 kg
Gold	Zhamalbek Asylbek Uulu	Sambo	Men's - 82 kg
Gold	Beknazar Raiymkul Uulu	Sambo	Men's Combat - 74 kg
Gold	Zhanybek Amatov	Sambo	Men's Combat - 90 kg
Gold	Kaly Sulaimanov	Wrestling	Men's Greco-Roman - 59 kg
