= Qamar Abbas =

Pakistani wrestler (born 1989)

Medal record

Men's Wrestling

Representing Pakistan

Commonwealth Games
Silver medal – second place	2014 Glasgow	Freestyle (74kg)

Qamar Abbas (born 1 September 1989, Faisalabad) is a freestyle wrestler from Pakistan.

== Career ==
Abbas won the silver medal for his country in the 74 kg freestyle event at the 2014 Commonwealth Games in Glasgow. He lost in the final to India's Sushil Kumar.
