= Mongolia at the 2017 Asian Indoor and Martial Arts Games =

- Flag of Mongolia
- IOC code: MGL

Asian Indoor and Martial Arts Games appearances
- 2005; 2007; 2009; 2013; 2017; 2021; 2025

Mongolia competed at the 2017 Asian Indoor and Martial Arts Games held in Ashgabat, Turkmenistan.

== Medal summary ==
=== Medalists ===
Medal	Name	Sport	Event
Gold	Otgony Mönkhtsetseg	Belt wrestling	Women's freestyle +70 kg
Bronze	Boldkhüügiin Sükhbat	Pahlavani wrestling	70 kg
Bronze	Enkhbatyn Dölgöön; Gotovyn Tsengüünbayar; Avarzediin Gansükh; Davaasambuugiin Delgernyam	3x3 basketball	Men's tournament
