= Kazakhstan at the 2017 Asian Indoor and Martial Arts Games =

- Flag of Kazakhstan
- IOC code: KAZ
- Medals: Gold 0 Silver 0 Bronze 0 Total 0

Asian Indoor and Martial Arts Games appearances
- 2005; 2007; 2009; 2013; 2017; 2021; 2026

Kazakhstan competed at the 2017 Asian Indoor and Martial Arts Games held in Ashgabat, Turkmenistan.

== Medal summary ==
=== Medalists ===
Medal	Name	Sport	Event
Gold	Sergey Grigoryev	Indoor athletics	Men's pole vault
Gold	Ivan Ivanov	Indoor athletics	Men's shot put
Gold	Viktoriya Zyabkina	Indoor athletics	Women's 60 m
Gold	Elina Mikhina	Indoor athletics	Women's 400 m
Gold	Olga Rypakova	Indoor athletics	Women's long jump
Gold	Olga Rypakova	Indoor athletics	Women's triple jump
Silver	Kairat Sarymsakov	Taekwondo	Men's 74 kg
Silver	Mariya Ovchinnikova	Indoor athletics	Women's triple jump
Bronze	Mikhail Litvin	Indoor athletics	Men's 400 m
Bronze	Olga Safronova	Indoor athletics	Women's 60 m
Bronze	Anastassiya Vinogradova	Indoor athletics	Women's 60 m hurdles
Bronze	Aituar Shaikenov	Taekwondo	Women's 54 kg
