= Turkmenistan at the 2017 Asian Indoor and Martial Arts Games =

- Flag of Turkmenistan
- IOC code: TKM

in Ashgabat
- Medals: Gold 0 Silver 0 Bronze 2 Total 2

Asian Indoor and Martial Arts Games appearances
- 2005; 2007; 2009; 2013; 2017; 2021; 2025

The host country of Turkmenistan competed at the 2017 Asian Indoor and Martial Arts Games, which were held at Ashgabat, Turkmenistan.

== Medal summary ==
=== Medalists ===
Medal	Name	Sport	Event
Bronze	Walentina Meredowa; Mariýa Rozymowa; Täjigözel Orazgeldiýewa; Ýelena Rýabowa	Indoor athletics	Women's 4 × 400 m relay
Bronze	Leýla Halilowa; Aýna Gokowa; Nigýara Nagiýewa; Mähri Jumageldiýewa	3x3 basketball	Women's tournament
