= Tajikistan at the 2017 Asian Indoor and Martial Arts Games =

- Flag of Tajikistan
- IOC code: TJK

Asian Indoor and Martial Arts Games appearances
- 2007; 2009; 2013; 2017; 2021; 2025

Tajikistan competed at the 2017 Asian Indoor and Martial Arts Games held in Ashgabat, Turkmenistan.

== Medal summary ==
=== Medalists ===
Medal	Name	Sport	Event
Silver	Rustam Iskandari	Wrestling	Men's freestyle 97 kg
Silver	Manuchehr Nematov	Taekwondo	Men's 54 kg
