= Pakistan women's national judo team =

Judo team

The Pakistan women's national judo team represents Pakistan in international judo competitions. It is administered by the Pakistan Judo Federation (PJF). Members of the team compete in competitions including regional games (South Asian Games).

== Events ==
Pakistan has sent a team to the following events:

=== Championships ===
1. Asia-Pacific Judo Championships: 2019
2. Asian Judo Championships: 2010,
3. Commonwealth Judo Championships: 2018
4. World Judo Championships : 2010, 2019

=== Games ===
1. South Asian Games: 2010 to date

== History ==
In 2010, Pakistan sent its first ever team to the World Judo Championships held in Tokyo, Japan. The five member team included Fouzia Mumtaz. At the Commonwealth Judo Championships held in Jaipur, India in 2018, a five member women's team was part of the first full fledged 19 member contingent sent to compete internationally.

== Members ==
Current Members
| Name | Team (domestic) | Competitions | Events | Medals |
|---|---|---|---|---|
| Amina Toyoda | Pakistan Army | South Asian Games: 2019; World Judo Championships: 2019 | -57 kg | Bronze -- |
| Asma Rani | | Commonwealth Judo Championships: 2018 South Asian Games: 2019 | -- Mixed team | -- Silver |
| Beenish Khan | | Asian Martial Arts Games: 2009 Commonwealth Judo Championships: 2018 South Asian Games: 2016, 2019 | -- -- -70 kg (2016), mixed team (2019) | -- -- Silver (2016, 2019). |
| Humaira Ashiq | | Asian Martial Arts Games: 2009 Commonwealth Judo Championships: 2018 South Asian Games: 2010, 2016, 2019 World Judo Championships: 2019 | -- -- -52 kg (2010), -48 kg (2016, 2019) -48 kg | -- -- Bronze (2010), silver (2016) bronze (2019) -- |

| Name | Team (domestic) | Competitions | Events | Medals |
|---|---|---|---|---|
| Ambreen Ashiq | | South Asian Games: 2016 | -63 kg | Bronze |
| Fouzia Mumtaz | | South Asian Games: 2010 World Judo Championships: 2010 | -63 kg-70 kg | Silver- |
| Fouzia Yassir | | South Asian Games: 2016 | -78 kg | Gold |
| Iran Shehzadi | | South Asian Games: 2016 | -52 kg | Bronze |
| Maryam | | Commonwealth Judo Championships: 2018 | | |
| Shumaila Gul | | Commonwealth Judo Championships: 2018 South Asian Games: 2016 | -- -57 kg | -- Bronze |

== Medals ==
South Asian Games
| Games | Gold | Silver | Bronze | Total |
|---|---|---|---|---|
| (Bangladesh) Dhaka (2010) | 0 | 1 | 1 | 2 |
| (India) Guwahati (2016) | 1 | 2 | 3 | 6 |
| (Nepal) Kathmandu (2019) | 0 | 0 | 2 | 2 |
| Total | 1 | 2 | 5 | 10 |
