= Turkmen goresh at the 2017 Asian Indoor and Martial Arts Games =

- Venue: Ashgabat Main Indoor Arena
- Dates: 16–18 September 2017

Turkmen goresh (as Traditional wrestling) was contested at the 2017 Asian Indoor and Martial Arts Games in Ashgabat, Turkmenistan from 16 September to 18 September 2017. The competition took place at Ashgabat Main Indoor Arena.

== Medalists ==
=== Men's freestyle ===
Event	Gold	Silver	Bronze
57 kg	Allanur Goçow; Turkmenistan	Ýakupnazar Ýakubow; Turkmenistan	Alvin Lobreguito; Philippines
57 kg	Allanur Goçow; Turkmenistan	Ýakupnazar Ýakubow; Turkmenistan	Faridun Qurbonov; Tajikistan
62 kg	Nowruz Eýeberdiýew; Turkmenistan	Jawid Ahmad Amiri; Afghanistan	Fayzulla Ummatov; Uzbekistan
62 kg	Nowruz Eýeberdiýew; Turkmenistan	Jawid Ahmad Amiri; Afghanistan	Abdurasul Khabibullaev; Uzbekistan
68 kg	Döwletgeldi Berdiýew; Turkmenistan	Toýlymyrat Durdymyradow; Turkmenistan	Shakhobiddin Sangilov; Uzbekistan
68 kg	Döwletgeldi Berdiýew; Turkmenistan	Toýlymyrat Durdymyradow; Turkmenistan	Esmaeil Amiri; Iran
75 kg	Ilkhomjon Mashrabov; Uzbekistan	Orazmämmet Welmämmedow; Turkmenistan	Derýa Abdyýew; Turkmenistan
75 kg	Ilkhomjon Mashrabov; Uzbekistan	Orazmämmet Welmämmedow; Turkmenistan	Ghasem Dazi; Iran
82 kg	Silapberdi Nuryýew; Turkmenistan	Begmyrat Baýdurdyýew; Turkmenistan	Eldor Nematov; Uzbekistan
82 kg	Silapberdi Nuryýew; Turkmenistan	Begmyrat Baýdurdyýew; Turkmenistan	Habibollah Torabi; Iran
90 kg	Obidali Mavlonov; Uzbekistan	Öwezgeldi Berdiýew; Turkmenistan	Arslan Ybraýymgulyýew; Turkmenistan
90 kg	Obidali Mavlonov; Uzbekistan	Öwezgeldi Berdiýew; Turkmenistan	Anushervon Navruzzoda; Tajikistan
100 kg	Seýdi Batyrow; Turkmenistan	Bäşim Aýazow; Turkmenistan	Abdurahmon Mamatqulov; Tajikistan
100 kg	Seýdi Batyrow; Turkmenistan	Bäşim Aýazow; Turkmenistan	Islomjon Kuldashev; Uzbekistan
+100 kg	None awarded	Annamyrat Myradow; Turkmenistan	Gongoryn Pürevbaatar; Mongolia
+100 kg	None awarded	Annamyrat Myradow; Turkmenistan	Samandar Ernazarov; Tajikistan

=== Men's classic style ===
Event	Gold	Silver	Bronze
57 kg	Allanur Goçow; Turkmenistan	Şatlyk Myradow; Turkmenistan	Muhammad Saeed Anwar; Pakistan
57 kg	Allanur Goçow; Turkmenistan	Şatlyk Myradow; Turkmenistan	Khusan Nosirov; Uzbekistan
62 kg	Ismaýyl Orazow; Turkmenistan	Isgender Aşyrow; Turkmenistan	Fayzulla Ummatov; Uzbekistan
62 kg	Ismaýyl Orazow; Turkmenistan	Isgender Aşyrow; Turkmenistan	Enkhtaivany Enkhbold; Mongolia
68 kg	Döwletgeldi Berdiýew; Turkmenistan	Arslan Hojamberdiýew; Turkmenistan	Shakhobiddin Sangilov; Uzbekistan
68 kg	Döwletgeldi Berdiýew; Turkmenistan	Arslan Hojamberdiýew; Turkmenistan	Elbek Sotvoldiev; Uzbekistan
75 kg	Rejepgeldi Gylyçnyýazow; Turkmenistan	Bäşim Orazow; Turkmenistan	Ilkhomjon Mashrabov; Uzbekistan
75 kg	Rejepgeldi Gylyçnyýazow; Turkmenistan	Bäşim Orazow; Turkmenistan	Kenenbek Shamshidin Uulu; Kyrgyzstan
82 kg	Hanmuhammet Patdyýew; Turkmenistan	Esenbek Kudaiberdiev; Kyrgyzstan	Hasan Yoriev; Tajikistan
82 kg	Hanmuhammet Patdyýew; Turkmenistan	Esenbek Kudaiberdiev; Kyrgyzstan	Sayed Gul Mehraban; Afghanistan
90 kg	None awarded	Hamed Mirzapour; Iran	Obidali Mavlonov; Uzbekistan
90 kg	None awarded	Hamed Mirzapour; Iran	Jawid Ahmad Ahmadi; Afghanistan
100 kg	Seýdi Batyrow; Turkmenistan	Kerim Rejepow; Turkmenistan	Abdurahmon Mamatqulov; Tajikistan
100 kg	Seýdi Batyrow; Turkmenistan	Kerim Rejepow; Turkmenistan	Islomjon Kuldashev; Uzbekistan
+100 kg	None awarded	Jepbar Atamämmedow; Turkmenistan	Mahmad Mirov; Tajikistan
+100 kg	None awarded	Jepbar Atamämmedow; Turkmenistan	Samandar Ernazarov; Tajikistan

=== Women's freestyle ===
Event	Gold	Silver	Bronze
52 kg	Laçyn Badaglyýewa; Turkmenistan	Shakhzoda Ergasheva; Uzbekistan	Gulfiýa Jumaýewa; Turkmenistan
52 kg	Laçyn Badaglyýewa; Turkmenistan	Shakhzoda Ergasheva; Uzbekistan	Manzuraoy Muydinova; Uzbekistan
58 kg	Zuhra Madraimowa; Turkmenistan	Gulkhumoroy Dadaboeva; Uzbekistan	Ambreen Masih; Pakistan
58 kg	Zuhra Madraimowa; Turkmenistan	Gulkhumoroy Dadaboeva; Uzbekistan	Ochirpüreviin Lkhagvakhüü; Mongolia
63 kg	None awarded	None awarded	Dilafruz Mamadjonova; Uzbekistan
63 kg	None awarded	None awarded	None awarded
70 kg	None awarded	Gulmira Ismatova; Uzbekistan	Anita Dwi Nengrum; Indonesia
70 kg	None awarded	Gulmira Ismatova; Uzbekistan	Rano Uzakowa; Turkmenistan
+70 kg	Otgony Mönkhtsetseg; Mongolia	Ganboldyn Sarangoo; Mongolia	Jahan Muhammedowa; Turkmenistan
+70 kg	Otgony Mönkhtsetseg; Mongolia	Ganboldyn Sarangoo; Mongolia	Maksuda Egemberdiýewa; Turkmenistan

=== Women's classic style ===
Event	Gold	Silver	Bronze
52 kg	Laçyn Badaglyýewa; Turkmenistan	Botagoz Dyussembayeva; Kazakhstan	Manzuraoy Muydinova; Uzbekistan
52 kg	Laçyn Badaglyýewa; Turkmenistan	Botagoz Dyussembayeva; Kazakhstan	Leila Siahvashi; Iran
58 kg	Zuhra Madraimowa; Turkmenistan	Nazira Marsbek Kyzy; Kyrgyzstan	Reihaneh Sheikhian; Iran
58 kg	Zuhra Madraimowa; Turkmenistan	Nazira Marsbek Kyzy; Kyrgyzstan	Zarina Abdyrahmanowa; Turkmenistan
63 kg	None awarded	Dilafruz Mamadjonova; Uzbekistan	Khavaskhon Jurakuzieva; Uzbekistan
63 kg	None awarded	Dilafruz Mamadjonova; Uzbekistan	Uulkan Alibai Kyzy; Kyrgyzstan
70 kg	None awarded	Meerim Zhumanazarova; Kyrgyzstan	Rano Uzakowa; Turkmenistan
70 kg	None awarded	Meerim Zhumanazarova; Kyrgyzstan	Gulmira Ismatova; Uzbekistan
+70 kg	Jahan Muhammedowa; Turkmenistan	Nyamkhüügiin Nyamtuyaa; Mongolia	Nazira Arzybekova; Kyrgyzstan
+70 kg	Jahan Muhammedowa; Turkmenistan	Nyamkhüügiin Nyamtuyaa; Mongolia	Maksuda Egemberdiýewa; Turkmenistan

== Medal table ==
Rank	Nation	Gold	Silver	Bronze	Total
1	Turkmenistan (TKM)	16	13	9	38
2	Uzbekistan (UZB)	2	4	17	23
3	Mongolia (MGL)	1	2	3	6
4	Kyrgyzstan (KGZ)	0	3	3	6
5	Iran (IRI)	0	1	5	6
6	Afghanistan (AFG)	0	1	2	3
7	Kazakhstan (KAZ)	0	1	0	1
8	Tajikistan (TJK)	0	0	8	8
9	Pakistan (PAK)	0	0	2	2
10	Indonesia (INA)	0	0	1	1
10	Philippines (PHI)	0	0	1	1
Totals (11 entries)		19	25	51	95

== Results ==
=== Men's freestyle ===
==== 57 kg ====
16 September

Quarterfinals
Muhammad Saeed Anwar (PAK)
Ýakupnazar Ýakubow (TKM)	DQ
Faridun Qurbonov (TJK)	DQ
Ghasem Norouzi (IRI)
Allanur Goçow (TKM)	2
Khusan Nosirov (UZB)	0

Semifinals
Alvin Lobreguito (PHI)	0
Ýakupnazar Ýakubow (TKM)	2
Faridun Qurbonov (TJK)	0
Allanur Goçow (TKM)	2

Final
Ýakupnazar Ýakubow (TKM)	0
Allanur Goçow (TKM)	2

==== 62 kg ====
16 September

Quarterfinals
Nasser Ghorbanpour (IRI)
Fayzulla Ummatov (UZB)	DQ
Nowruz Eýeberdiýew (TKM)	DQ
Rana Muhammad Adnan (PAK)
Jawid Ahmad Amiri (AFG)	3
Tirkişgeldi Aýazow (TKM)	1
Abdurasul Khabibullaev (UZB)	3
Ibodullo Aliberdizoda (TJK)	1

Semifinals
Fayzulla Ummatov (UZB)	0
Nowruz Eýeberdiýew (TKM)	2
Jawid Ahmad Amiri (AFG)	DQ
Abdurasul Khabibullaev (UZB)

Final
Nowruz Eýeberdiýew (TKM)	2
Jawid Ahmad Amiri (AFG)	0

==== 68 kg ====
16 September

Quarterfinals		Semifinals		Final
Shakhobiddin Sangilov (UZB)	1
Musurmonqul Mustafoqulov (TJK)	0	Shakhobiddin Sangilov (UZB)	0
Toýlymyrat Durdymyradow (TKM)	2	Toýlymyrat Durdymyradow (TKM)	2
Abdul Shafi Naseri (AFG)	0			Toýlymyrat Durdymyradow (TKM)	0
Esmaeil Amiri (IRI)	2			Döwletgeldi Berdiýew (TKM)	2
Elbek Sotvoldiev (UZB)	0	Esmaeil Amiri (IRI)
Döwletgeldi Berdiýew (TKM)	2	Döwletgeldi Berdiýew (TKM)	DQ
Jhonny Morte (PHI)	0

==== 75 kg ====
16 September

Quarterfinals		Semifinals		Final
		Ilkhomjon Mashrabov (UZB)	2
Derýa Abdyýew (TKM)	2	Derýa Abdyýew (TKM)	0
Ali Ahmad Ghoorzai (AFG)	0			Ilkhomjon Mashrabov (UZB)	2
Behruz Gulmahmadzoda (TJK)	1			Orazmämmet Welmämmedow (TKM)	1
Orazmämmet Welmämmedow (TKM)	2	Orazmämmet Welmämmedow (TKM)	2
Ghasem Dazi (IRI)	2	Ghasem Dazi (IRI)	0
Husnidin Ruziev (UZB)	1

==== 82 kg ====
16 September

Quarterfinals
Eldor Nematov (UZB)	2
Hekmatullah Fanoos (AFG)	0
Hafeez Ullah (PAK)
Begmyrat Baýdurdyýew (TKM)	DQ
Kamoliddin Makhkamov (UZB)	0
Silapberdi Nuryýew (TKM)	2
Habibollah Torabi (IRI)	1
Zulakbar Sultonov (TJK)	0

Semifinals
Eldor Nematov (UZB)	0
Begmyrat Baýdurdyýew (TKM)	2
Silapberdi Nuryýew (TKM)	DQ
Habibollah Torabi (IRI)

Final
Begmyrat Baýdurdyýew (TKM)	0
Silapberdi Nuryýew (TKM)	2

==== 90 kg ====
16 September

Quarterfinals
Arslan Ybraýymgulyýew (TKM)	2
Muhammad Adnan (PAK)	0
Bashir Ahmad Mohammadi (AFG)
Obidali Mavlonov (UZB)	DQ
Anushervon Navruzzoda (TJK)	2
Abdukakhkhor Egamov (UZB)	0
Öwezgeldi Berdiýew (TKM)	2
Davoud Avazzadeh (IRI)	0

Semifinals
Arslan Ybraýymgulyýew (TKM)
Obidali Mavlonov (UZB)	DQ
Anushervon Navruzzoda (TJK)	0
Öwezgeldi Berdiýew (TKM)	2

Final
Obidali Mavlonov (UZB)	2
Öwezgeldi Berdiýew (TKM)	1

==== 100 kg ====
16 September

Quarterfinals		Semifinals		Final
		Abdurahmon Mamatqulov (TJK)	0
Nuritdin Makhamadov (UZB)	0	Bäşim Aýazow (TKM)	2
Bäşim Aýazow (TKM)	2			Bäşim Aýazow (TKM)	1
Nader Sofizada (AFG)	0			Seýdi Batyrow (TKM)	2
Seýdi Batyrow (TKM)	2	Seýdi Batyrow (TKM)	2
Islomjon Kuldashev (UZB)	1	Islomjon Kuldashev (UZB)	0
Baataryn Batbold (MGL)	0

==== +100 kg ====
16 September

1/8 finals
Muhammad Basit (PAK)	0
Samandar Ernazarov (TJK)	2
Odiljon Suyunov (UZB)	2
Mohammad Pahlawanzada (AFG)	1

Quarterfinals
Gongoryn Pürevbaatar (MGL)	1
Sherzodjon Rakhimov (UZB)	0
Abdolvahed Mohammadi (IRI)	0
Rejepaly Orazalyýew (TKM)	2
Annamyrat Myradow (TKM)	2
Papang Ramadhani (INA)	0
Samandar Ernazarov (TJK)	2
Odiljon Suyunov (UZB)	1

Semifinals
Gongoryn Pürevbaatar (MGL)	0
Rejepaly Orazalyýew (TKM)	2
Annamyrat Myradow (TKM)	2
Samandar Ernazarov (TJK)	0

Final
Rejepaly Orazalyýew (TKM)	1
Annamyrat Myradow (TKM)	0

- Rejepaly Orazalyýew of Turkmenistan originally won the gold medal, but was disqualified after he tested positive for Oxandrolone.

=== Men's classic style ===
==== 57 kg ====
18 September

1/8 finals
Dnyaneshwar Tulshiram Bhoi (IND)	0
Allanur Goçow (TKM)	2
Khusan Nosirov (UZB)	2
Michael Jay Cater (PHI)	0
Amol Hariba Sathe (IND)	0
Berikbol Muratkhan (KAZ)	2
Şatlyk Myradow (TKM)	2
Faridun Qurbonov (TJK)	0
Muhammad Shahid (PAK)	0
Bekzat Tynchtykbek Uulu (KGZ)	2

Quarterfinals
Muhammad Saeed Anwar (PAK)	2
Shohimardon Zaripov (TJK)	0
Ghasem Norouzi (IRI)	0
Allanur Goçow (TKM)	2
Khusan Nosirov (UZB)	2
Berikbol Muratkhan (KAZ)	0
Şatlyk Myradow (TKM)	1
Bekzat Tynchtykbek Uulu (KGZ)	0

Semifinals
Muhammad Saeed Anwar (PAK)	0
Allanur Goçow (TKM)	2
Khusan Nosirov (UZB)	0
Şatlyk Myradow (TKM)	1

Final
Allanur Goçow (TKM)	2
Şatlyk Myradow (TKM)	1

==== 62 kg ====
18 September

1/8 finals
Isgender Aşyrow (TKM)	DQ
Santikumar Singh (IND)
Jonathan Maquilan (PHI)	WO
Jawid Ahmad Amiri (AFG)
Raiymbek Rantayev (KAZ)	0
Ismaýyl Orazow (TKM)	2
Amangeldi Esenbek Uulu (KGZ)	2
Hamad Butt (PAK)	0
Abdurasul Khabibullaev (UZB)	1
Enkhtaivany Enkhbold (MGL)	2
Vikramjit Singh (IND)
Nasser Ghorbanpour (IRI)	DQ

Quarterfinals
Pardaboi Mustafokulov (TJK)
Fayzulla Ummatov (UZB)	DQ
Isgender Aşyrow (TKM)	DQ
Jonathan Maquilan (PHI)
Ismaýyl Orazow (TKM)	2
Amangeldi Esenbek Uulu (KGZ)	0
Enkhtaivany Enkhbold (MGL)	DQ
Nasser Ghorbanpour (IRI)

Semifinals
Fayzulla Ummatov (UZB)	0
Isgender Aşyrow (TKM)	2
Ismaýyl Orazow (TKM)	DQ
Enkhtaivany Enkhbold (MGL)

Final
Isgender Aşyrow (TKM)	1
Ismaýyl Orazow (TKM)	2

==== 68 kg ====
18 September

1/8 finals
Abdul Shafi Naseri (AFG)	2
Abuehson Ashurzoda (TJK)	1
Elbek Sotvoldiev (UZB)	2
Adilet Shalgynbekuly (KAZ)	1
Shahzad Khan (PAK)	1
Esmaeil Amiri (IRI)	2
Romen Singh Tongbram (IND)	0
Döwletgeldi Berdiýew (TKM)	2
Musurmonqul Mustafoqulov (TJK)	2
Walid Noorzai (AFG)	0

Quarterfinals
Arslan Hojamberdiýew (TKM)	2
Muhammad Aqib Manzoor (PAK)	0
Shakhobiddin Sangilov (UZB)	2
Abdul Shafi Naseri (AFG)	0
Elbek Sotvoldiev (UZB)	2
Esmaeil Amiri (IRI)	0
Döwletgeldi Berdiýew (TKM)	2
Musurmonqul Mustafoqulov (TJK)	0

Semifinals
Arslan Hojamberdiýew (TKM)	2
Shakhobiddin Sangilov (UZB)	0
Elbek Sotvoldiev (UZB)	0
Döwletgeldi Berdiýew (TKM)	2

Final
Arslan Hojamberdiýew (TKM)
Döwletgeldi Berdiýew (TKM)	DQ

==== 75 kg ====
18 September

1/16 finals
Rejepgeldi Gylyçnyýazow (TKM)	2–0	Behruz Gulmahmadzoda (TJK)

1/8 finals
Jefferson Manatad (PHI)
Ilkhomjon Mashrabov (UZB)	DQ
Zyiamidin Sadybekov (KGZ)	0
Dauren Damen (KAZ)	2
Hanumant Digambar Korade (IND)
Mukhammadrizvon Azizi (TJK)	DQ
Bäşim Orazow (TKM)	2
Ghasem Dazi (IRI)	0
Muhammad Asad Butt (PAK)	0
Kenenbek Shamshidin Uulu (KGZ)	2
Auyezkhan Kurbankulov (KAZ)	0
Venuzo Dawhuo (IND)	2
Ali Ahmad Ghoorzai (AFG)	1
Naimat Ullah (PAK)	0
Husnidin Ruziev (UZB)	0
Rejepgeldi Gylyçnyýazow (TKM)	2

Quarterfinals
Ilkhomjon Mashrabov (UZB)	2
Dauren Damen (KAZ)	1
Mukhammadrizvon Azizi (TJK)	0
Bäşim Orazow (TKM)	2
Kenenbek Shamshidin Uulu (KGZ)	2
Venuzo Dawhuo (IND)	0
Ali Ahmad Ghoorzai (AFG)	0
Rejepgeldi Gylyçnyýazow (TKM)	2

Semifinals
Ilkhomjon Mashrabov (UZB)
Bäşim Orazow (TKM)	DQ
Kenenbek Shamshidin Uulu (KGZ)	0
Rejepgeldi Gylyçnyýazow (TKM)	2

Final
Bäşim Orazow (TKM)	0
Rejepgeldi Gylyçnyýazow (TKM)	2

==== 82 kg ====
18 September

1/8 finals
Kamoliddin Makhkamov (UZB)	0
Hanmuhammet Patdyýew (TKM)	1
Mohabat Ali Drigh (PAK)	0
Habibollah Torabi (IRI)	2
Zulakbar Sultonov (TJK)	1
Sayed Gul Mehraban (AFG)	2
Toýlymyrat Aýazow (TKM)	0
Esenbek Kudaiberdiev (KGZ)	1
Aidos Kulmanbetov (KAZ)	2
Hekmatullah Fanoos (TKM)	1

Quarterfinals
Eldor Nematov (UZB)	1
Hasan Yoriev (TJK)	2
Bekturkan Kozhomuratov (KGZ)
Hanmuhammet Patdyýew (TKM)	DQ
Habibollah Torabi (IRI)	0
Sayed Gul Mehraban (AFG)	2
Esenbek Kudaiberdiev (KGZ)	2
Aidos Kulmanbetov (KAZ)	1

Semifinals
Hasan Yoriev (TJK)	0
Hanmuhammet Patdyýew (TKM)	2
Sayed Gul Mehraban (AFG)	0
Esenbek Kudaiberdiev (KGZ)	2

Final
Hanmuhammet Patdyýew (TKM)	1
Esenbek Kudaiberdiev (KGZ)	0

==== 90 kg ====
18 September

1/8 finals
Anushervon Navruzzoda (TJK)	1
Bashir Ahmad Mohammadi (AFG)	2
Yersultan Muzapparov (KAZ)	1
Obidali Mavlonov (UZB)	2
Sangram Vilas Jadhav (IND)
Mohsin Raza (PAK)	DQ
Murgapgeldi Atdaýew (TKM)	2
Christof Hofmann (PHI)	0
Emomnazar Karimzoda (TJK)	2
Muhammad Adnan (PAK)	0
Hamed Mirzapour (IRI)	2
Akshay Shivaji Surve (IND)	1
Abdukakhkhor Egamov (UZB)	0
Jawid Ahmad Ahmadi (AFG)	2
Urmat Manapbaev (KGZ)
Resul Düwlenow (TKM)	DQ

Quarterfinals
Bashir Ahmad Mohammadi (AFG)	0
Obidali Mavlonov (UZB)	2
Mohsin Raza (PAK)	0
Murgapgeldi Atdaýew (TKM)	2
Emomnazar Karimzoda (TJK)	0
Hamed Mirzapour (IRI)	2
Jawid Ahmad Ahmadi (AFG)	2
Resul Düwlenow (TKM)	1

Semifinals
Obidali Mavlonov (UZB)	0
Murgapgeldi Atdaýew (TKM)	1
Hamed Mirzapour (IRI)	2
Jawid Ahmad Ahmadi (AFG)	0

Final
Murgapgeldi Atdaýew (TKM)	2
Hamed Mirzapour (IRI)	1

- Murgapgeldi Atdaýew of Turkmenistan originally won the gold medal, but was disqualified after he tested positive for Methylhexaneamine and 1,3-Dimethylbutylamine.

==== 100 kg ====
18 September

1/8 finals
Abdurahmon Mamatqulov (TJK)	2
Maroof (PAK)	0
Zhalil Zhorobekov (KGZ)	2
Hekmatullah Hakimi (AFG)	0
Atul Vasant Ghule (IND)
Kerim Rejepow (TKM)	DQ
Mahmoud Parvaneh (IRI)	0
Islomjon Kuldashev (UZB)	1
Nader Sofizada (AFG)	2
Dostonbek Yoriev (TJK)	1
Tilek Kuralov (KGZ)	1
Tayab Raza (PAK)	0
Swapnil Balu Phule (IND)	0
Seýdi Batyrow (TKM)	2

Quarterfinals
Bekbol Nurlanuly (KAZ)	0
Abdurahmon Mamatqulov (TJK)	2
Zhalil Zhorobekov (KGZ)
Kerim Rejepow (TKM)	DQ
Islomjon Kuldashev (UZB)	DQ
Nader Sofizada (AFG)
Tilek Kuralov (KGZ)
Seýdi Batyrow (TKM)	DQ

Semifinals
Abdurahmon Mamatqulov (TJK)
Kerim Rejepow (TKM)	DQ
Islomjon Kuldashev (UZB)	0
Seýdi Batyrow (TKM)	2

Final
Kerim Rejepow (TKM)	0
Seýdi Batyrow (TKM)	1

==== +100 kg ====
18 September

1/8 finals
Iliias Nishanov (KGZ)	2
Altaf Mabusab Mulla (IND)	0
Muhammad Basit (PAK)	0
Gongoryn Pürevbaatar (MGL)	2
Odiljon Suyunov (UZB)	0
Samandar Ernazarov (TJK)	2
Habib Gholampour (IRI)	0
Rejepaly Orazalyýew (TKM)	2
Papang Ramadhani (INA)	0
Mohammad Pahlawanzada (AFG)	2

Quarterfinals
Sherzodjon Rakhimov (UZB)	0
Jepbar Atamämmedow (TKM)	2
Mahmad Mirov (TJK)	1
Iliias Nishanov (KGZ)	0
Gongoryn Pürevbaatar (MGL)	0
Samandar Ernazarov (TJK)	2
Rejepaly Orazalyýew (TKM)	2
Mohammad Pahlawanzada (AFG)	0

Semifinals
Jepbar Atamämmedow (TKM)	2
Mahmad Mirov (TJK)	0
Samandar Ernazarov (TJK)	0
Rejepaly Orazalyýew (TKM)	1

Final
Jepbar Atamämmedow (TKM)	0
Rejepaly Orazalyýew (TKM)	1

- Rejepaly Orazalyýew of Turkmenistan originally won the gold medal, but was disqualified after he tested positive for Oxandrolone.

=== Women's freestyle ===
==== 52 kg ====
16 September

1/8 finals
Laçyn Badaglyýewa (TKM)	2
Dian Putri Rahmaniah (INA)	0

Quarterfinals
Leila Siahvashi (IRI)	0
Shakhzoda Ergasheva (UZB)	2
Gulfiýa Jumaýewa (TKM)	2
Humaira Ashiq (PAK)	0
Maryam (PAK)	0
Manzuraoy Muydinova (UZB)	2
Grace Loberanes (PHI)	0
Laçyn Badaglyýewa (TKM)	2

Semifinals
Shakhzoda Ergasheva (UZB)	2
Gulfiýa Jumaýewa (TKM)	0
Manzuraoy Muydinova (UZB)	0
Laçyn Badaglyýewa (TKM)	2

Final
Shakhzoda Ergasheva (UZB)	0
Laçyn Badaglyýewa (TKM)	2

==== 58 kg ====
16 September

Quarterfinals		Semifinals		Final
		Zuhra Madraimowa (TKM)	2
Noemi Tener (PHI)	1	Ambreen Masih (PAK)	0
Ambreen Masih (PAK)	2			Zuhra Madraimowa (TKM)	2
Ochirpüreviin Lkhagvakhüü (MGL)	2			Gulkhumoroy Dadaboeva (UZB)	0
Zarina Abdyrahmanowa (TKM)	0	Ochirpüreviin Lkhagvakhüü (MGL)	0
Gulkhumoroy Dadaboeva (UZB)	2	Gulkhumoroy Dadaboeva (UZB)	2
Zahra Mahmoudi (IRI)	0

==== 63 kg ====
16 September

Pos	Athlete	Pld	W	L	CP	UZB	UZB	IRI	TKM	TKM
3	Dilafruz Mamadjonova (UZB)	4	2	2	9	—	2–0	DSQ	0–2	Fall
4	Khavaskhon Jurakuzieva (UZB)	4	1	3	5	0–4 VP	—	DSQ	DSQ	0–2
5	Leila Salarvand (IRI)	4	0	4	0	0–5 VD	0–5 VD	—	Fall	DSQ
DQ	Gülnar Haýytbaýewa (TKM)	4	4	0	18	4–0 VP	5–0 VD	5–0 VF	—	2–0
DQ	Dinara Hallyýewa (TKM)	4	3	1	14	5–0 VF	4–0 VP	5–0 VD	0–4 VP	—

Source: Official website
- Gülnar Haýytbaýewa of Turkmenistan originally won the gold medal, but was disqualified after she tested positive for Methylhexaneamine and 1,3-Dimethylbutylamine.
- Dinara Hallyýewa of Turkmenistan originally won the silver medal, but was disqualified after she tested positive for Meldonium.

==== 70 kg ====
16 September

Quarterfinals
Beenish Khan (PAK)	0
Gulmira Ismatova (UZB)	2
Zahra Majdi (IRI)	0
Rano Uzakowa (TKM)	2

Semifinals
Anita Dwi Nengrum (INA)	0
Nasiba Surkiýewa (TKM)	2
Gulmira Ismatova (UZB)	2
Rano Uzakowa (TKM)	0

Final
Nasiba Surkiýewa (TKM)	2
Gulmira Ismatova (UZB)	1

- Nasiba Surkiýewa of Turkmenistan originally won the gold medal, but was disqualified after she tested positive for Methylhexaneamine and 1,3-Dimethylbutylamine.

==== +70 kg ====
16 September

Quarterfinals		Semifinals		Final
Sakhobat Sheralieva (UZB)	0
Jahan Muhammedowa (TKM)	1	Jahan Muhammedowa (TKM)	0
Otgony Mönkhtsetseg (MGL)	2	Otgony Mönkhtsetseg (MGL)	2
Saeideh Rahimi (IRI)	0			Otgony Mönkhtsetseg (MGL)	2
Mariya Sedunova (TJK)	0			Ganboldyn Sarangoo (MGL)	0
Maksuda Egemberdiýewa (TKM)	2	Maksuda Egemberdiýewa (TKM)	0
Ridha Wahdaniyati (INA)	1	Ganboldyn Sarangoo (MGL)	1
Ganboldyn Sarangoo (MGL)	2

=== Women's classic style ===
==== 52 kg ====
18 September

1/8 finals
Manzuraoy Muydinova (UZB)	1
Aýna Zaripowa (TKM)	0
Anara Ryskulova (KGZ)	1
Leila Siahvashi (IRI)	2
Humaira Ashiq (PAK)	2
Grace Loberanes (PHI)	0
Shamal Sunil Belgaonkar (IND)
Laçyn Badaglyýewa (TKM)	DQ
Dian Putri Rahmaniah (INA)
Shakhzoda Ergasheva (UZB)	DQ

Quarterfinals
Maryam (PAK)	0
Botagoz Dyussembayeva (KAZ)	2
Rani Laxman Jagtap (IND)	0
Manzuraoy Muydinova (UZB)	2
Leila Siahvashi (IRI)	1
Humaira Ashiq (PAK)	0
Laçyn Badaglyýewa (TKM)	DQ
Shakhzoda Ergasheva (UZB)

Semifinals
Botagoz Dyussembayeva (KAZ)	1
Manzuraoy Muydinova (UZB)	0
Leila Siahvashi (IRI)	0
Laçyn Badaglyýewa (TKM)	2

Final
Botagoz Dyussembayeva (KAZ)
Laçyn Badaglyýewa (TKM)	DQ

==== 58 kg ====
18 September

1/8 finals
Ulzhan Dyussembayeva (KAZ)	0
Zuhra Madraimowa (TKM)	2

Quarterfinals
Ambreen Masih (PAK)	0
Nazira Marsbek Kyzy (KGZ)	2
Reihaneh Sheikhian (IRI)	DQ
Pallavi Bhat (IND)
Zarina Abdyrahmanowa (TKM)	2
Gulkhumoroy Dadaboeva (UZB)	0
Noemi Tener (PHI)
Zuhra Madraimowa (TKM)	DQ

Semifinals
Nazira Marsbek Kyzy (KGZ)	1
Reihaneh Sheikhian (IRI)	0
Zarina Abdyrahmanowa (TKM)
Zuhra Madraimowa (TKM)	DQ

Final
Nazira Marsbek Kyzy (KGZ)
Zuhra Madraimowa (TKM)	DQ

==== 63 kg ====
18 September

Quarterfinals
Uulkan Alibai Kyzy (KGZ)	2
Sahar Ghanizadeh (IRI)	1
Dilafruz Mamadjonova (UZB)	2
Dinara Hallyýewa (TKM)	1

Semifinals
Gülnar Haýytbaýewa (TKM)	DQ
Khavaskhon Jurakuzieva (UZB)
Uulkan Alibai Kyzy (KGZ)	0
Dilafruz Mamadjonova (UZB)	2

Final
Gülnar Haýytbaýewa (TKM)	2
Dilafruz Mamadjonova (UZB)	0

- Gülnar Haýytbaýewa of Turkmenistan originally won the gold medal, but was disqualified after she tested positive for Methylhexaneamine and 1,3-Dimethylbutylamine.
- Dinara Hallyýewa of Turkmenistan originally finished fifth, but was disqualified after she tested positive for Meldonium.

==== 70 kg ====
18 September

1/8 finals
Divya Guruling Shilwant (IND)
Mariya Sedunova (TJK)	DQ
Nasiba Surkiýewa (TKM)	2
Perizat Zhakypbekova (KAZ)	0

Quarterfinals
Meerim Zhumanazarova (KGZ)	2
Beenish Khan (PAK)	0
Rano Uzakowa (TKM)	WD
Sara Alipour (IRI)
Anita Dwi Nengrum (INA)
Gulmira Ismatova (UZB)	DQ
Mariya Sedunova (TJK)	0
Nasiba Surkiýewa (TKM)	2

Semifinals
Meerim Zhumanazarova (KGZ)	2
Rano Uzakowa (TKM)	0
Gulmira Ismatova (UZB)	1
Nasiba Surkiýewa (TKM)	1

Final
Meerim Zhumanazarova (KGZ)	0
Nasiba Surkiýewa (TKM)	1

- Nasiba Surkiýewa of Turkmenistan originally won the gold medal, but was disqualified after she tested positive for Methylhexaneamine and 1,3-Dimethylbutylamine.

==== +70 kg ====
18 September

1/8 finals
Sakhobat Sheralieva (UZB)	1
Nyamkhüügiin Nyamtuyaa (MGL)	2

Quarterfinals
Nazira Arzybekova (KGZ)	2
Ridha Wahdaniyati (INA)	1
Jahan Muhammedowa (TKM)	DQ
Pratiksha Chandrakant Parhar (IND)
Aiperi Medet Kyzy (KGZ)	0
Maksuda Egemberdiýewa (TKM)	1
Asieh Shojaei (IRI)	0
Nyamkhüügiin Nyamtuyaa (MGL)	2

Semifinals
Nazira Arzybekova (KGZ)	0
Jahan Muhammedowa (TKM)	2
Maksuda Egemberdiýewa (TKM)	0
Nyamkhüügiin Nyamtuyaa (MGL)	1

Final
Jahan Muhammedowa (TKM)	DQ
Nyamkhüügiin Nyamtuyaa (MGL)
