= Belt wrestling at the 2017 Asian Indoor and Martial Arts Games =

- Venue: Ashgabat Main Indoor Arena
- Dates: 19–20 September 2017

Belt wrestling was contested at the 2017 Asian Indoor and Martial Arts Games in Ashgabat, Turkmenistan from 19 September to 20 September 2017. The competition took place at Ashgabat Main Indoor Arena.

== Medalists ==
=== Men's freestyle ===
Event	Gold	Silver	Bronze
55 kg	Tagantäç Güýçmämmedow; Turkmenistan	Mälik Annabaýew; Turkmenistan	Didar Satbayev; Kazakhstan
55 kg	Tagantäç Güýçmämmedow; Turkmenistan	Mälik Annabaýew; Turkmenistan	Oyatullo Khojaev; Tajikistan
60 kg	Arslan Aşyrgeldiýew; Turkmenistan	Agageldi Tagandurdyýew; Turkmenistan	Ibodullo Aliberdizoda; Tajikistan
60 kg	Arslan Aşyrgeldiýew; Turkmenistan	Agageldi Tagandurdyýew; Turkmenistan	Abdurasul Khabibullaev; Uzbekistan
65 kg	Begenç Ýagmyrow; Turkmenistan	Tirkişgeldi Aýazow; Turkmenistan	Erkinbek Abdunabiev; Tajikistan
65 kg	Begenç Ýagmyrow; Turkmenistan	Tirkişgeldi Aýazow; Turkmenistan	Elbek Sotvoldiev; Uzbekistan
70 kg	Ýagşymyrat Annamyradow; Turkmenistan	Husnidin Ruziev; Uzbekistan	Dharmender; India
70 kg	Ýagşymyrat Annamyradow; Turkmenistan	Husnidin Ruziev; Uzbekistan	Rozymyrat Medow; Turkmenistan
80 kg	Silapberdi Nuryýew; Turkmenistan	Ruslan Tavaldiev; Kyrgyzstan	Eldor Nematov; Uzbekistan
80 kg	Silapberdi Nuryýew; Turkmenistan	Ruslan Tavaldiev; Kyrgyzstan	Yaser Mohammadi; Iran
90 kg	Arslan Ybraýymgulyýew; Turkmenistan	Yersultan Muzapparov; Kazakhstan	Gylyç Jumaýew; Turkmenistan
90 kg	Arslan Ybraýymgulyýew; Turkmenistan	Yersultan Muzapparov; Kazakhstan	Davoud Avazzadeh; Iran
100 kg	Seýdi Batyrow; Turkmenistan	Hoşgeldi Hanaýew; Turkmenistan	Kadyr Kelsinbekov; Kyrgyzstan
100 kg	Seýdi Batyrow; Turkmenistan	Hoşgeldi Hanaýew; Turkmenistan	Nazir Ahmad Hossaini; Afghanistan
+100 kg	Myrat Jumaýew; Turkmenistan	Sherzodjon Rakhimov; Uzbekistan	Muhammad Basit; Pakistan
+100 kg	Myrat Jumaýew; Turkmenistan	Sherzodjon Rakhimov; Uzbekistan	Iliias Nishanov; Kyrgyzstan

=== Men's classic style ===
Event	Gold	Silver	Bronze
55 kg	Bekzat Tynchtykbek Uulu; Kyrgyzstan	Sapa Jumaýew; Turkmenistan	Khusan Nosirov; Uzbekistan
55 kg	Bekzat Tynchtykbek Uulu; Kyrgyzstan	Sapa Jumaýew; Turkmenistan	Myrathan Azadow; Turkmenistan
60 kg	Medet Hallygurbanow; Turkmenistan	Erlanbek Murzabekov; Kyrgyzstan	Agajan Täçmuhammedow; Turkmenistan
60 kg	Medet Hallygurbanow; Turkmenistan	Erlanbek Murzabekov; Kyrgyzstan	Fayzulla Ummatov; Uzbekistan
65 kg	Agamyrat Orazsähedow; Turkmenistan	Rüstemgeldi Agageldiýew; Turkmenistan	Khudoyor Rajabzoda; Tajikistan
65 kg	Agamyrat Orazsähedow; Turkmenistan	Rüstemgeldi Agageldiýew; Turkmenistan	Muhammad Safdar; Pakistan
70 kg	Husnidin Ruziev; Uzbekistan	Hangeldi Allakow; Turkmenistan	Madaminbek Sharshenaly Uulu; Kyrgyzstan
70 kg	Husnidin Ruziev; Uzbekistan	Hangeldi Allakow; Turkmenistan	Orazmyrat Orazmyradow; Turkmenistan
80 kg	Aidos Kulmanbetov; Kazakhstan	Eldor Nematov; Uzbekistan	Yaser Mohammadi; Iran
80 kg	Aidos Kulmanbetov; Kazakhstan	Eldor Nematov; Uzbekistan	Jefferson Manatad; Philippines
90 kg	Obidali Mavlonov; Uzbekistan	Öwezgeldi Berdiýew; Turkmenistan	Dostonbek Pochoev; Tajikistan
90 kg	Obidali Mavlonov; Uzbekistan	Öwezgeldi Berdiýew; Turkmenistan	Yersultan Muzapparov; Kazakhstan
100 kg	Seýdi Batyrow; Turkmenistan	Islomjon Kuldashev; Uzbekistan	Orozbek Ashirov; Kyrgyzstan
100 kg	Seýdi Batyrow; Turkmenistan	Islomjon Kuldashev; Uzbekistan	Bekbol Nurlanuly; Kazakhstan
+100 kg	Sherzodjon Rakhimov; Uzbekistan	Ahal Ballarow; Turkmenistan	Mahmad Mirov; Tajikistan
+100 kg	Sherzodjon Rakhimov; Uzbekistan	Ahal Ballarow; Turkmenistan	Odiljon Suyunov; Uzbekistan

=== Women's freestyle ===
Event	Gold	Silver	Bronze
50 kg	Laçyn Badaglyýewa; Turkmenistan	Shakhzoda Ergasheva; Uzbekistan	Maryam; Pakistan
50 kg	Laçyn Badaglyýewa; Turkmenistan	Shakhzoda Ergasheva; Uzbekistan	Manzuraoy Muydinova; Uzbekistan
55 kg	Zarina Abdyrahmanowa; Turkmenistan	Zahra Yazdani; Iran	Anara Ryskulova; Kyrgyzstan
55 kg	Zarina Abdyrahmanowa; Turkmenistan	Zahra Yazdani; Iran	Gulkhumoroy Dadaboeva; Uzbekistan
60 kg	Zuhra Madraimowa; Turkmenistan	Roza Taşpulatowa; Turkmenistan	Zahra Mahmoudi; Iran
60 kg	Zuhra Madraimowa; Turkmenistan	Roza Taşpulatowa; Turkmenistan	None awarded
65 kg	None awarded	None awarded	Uulkan Alibai Kyzy; Kyrgyzstan
65 kg	None awarded	None awarded	Dilafruz Mamadjonova; Uzbekistan
70 kg	None awarded	Perizat Zhakypbekova; Kazakhstan	Beenish Khan; Pakistan
70 kg	None awarded	Perizat Zhakypbekova; Kazakhstan	Zahra Majdi; Iran
+70 kg	Otgony Mönkhtsetseg; Mongolia	Altynai Mamarasul Kyzy; Kyrgyzstan	Nazira Arzybekova; Kyrgyzstan
+70 kg	Otgony Mönkhtsetseg; Mongolia	Altynai Mamarasul Kyzy; Kyrgyzstan	Saeideh Rahimi; Iran

=== Women's classic style ===
Event	Gold	Silver	Bronze
50 kg	Laçyn Badaglyýewa; Turkmenistan	Shakhzoda Ergasheva; Uzbekistan	Leila Siahvashi; Iran
50 kg	Laçyn Badaglyýewa; Turkmenistan	Shakhzoda Ergasheva; Uzbekistan	Humaira Ashiq; Pakistan
55 kg	Zarina Abdyrahmanowa; Turkmenistan	Meerim Miizamidin Kyzy; Kyrgyzstan	Ambreen Masih; Pakistan
55 kg	Zarina Abdyrahmanowa; Turkmenistan	Meerim Miizamidin Kyzy; Kyrgyzstan	Gulfiýa Jumaýewa; Turkmenistan
60 kg	Zuhra Madraimowa; Turkmenistan	Meerim Momunova; Kyrgyzstan	Roza Taşpulatowa; Turkmenistan
60 kg	Zuhra Madraimowa; Turkmenistan	Meerim Momunova; Kyrgyzstan	None awarded
65 kg	None awarded	Dilafruz Mamadjonova; Uzbekistan	Khavaskhon Jurakuzieva; Uzbekistan
65 kg	None awarded	Dilafruz Mamadjonova; Uzbekistan	None awarded
70 kg	None awarded	Perizat Zhakypbekova; Kazakhstan	Beenish Khan; Pakistan
70 kg	None awarded	Perizat Zhakypbekova; Kazakhstan	Nurzat Baktyiar Kyzy; Kyrgyzstan
+70 kg	Maksuda Egemberdiýewa; Turkmenistan	Jahan Muhammedowa; Turkmenistan	Ganboldyn Sarangoo; Mongolia
+70 kg	Maksuda Egemberdiýewa; Turkmenistan	Jahan Muhammedowa; Turkmenistan	Asieh Shojaei; Iran

== Medal table ==
Rank	Nation	Gold	Silver	Bronze	Total
1	Turkmenistan (TKM)	18	11	7	36
2	Uzbekistan (UZB)	3	7	10	20
3	Kyrgyzstan (KGZ)	1	5	8	14
4	Kazakhstan (KAZ)	1	3	3	7
5	Mongolia (MGL)	1	0	1	2
6	Iran (IRI)	0	1	8	9
7	Pakistan (PAK)	0	0	7	7
8	Tajikistan (TJK)	0	0	6	6
9	Afghanistan (AFG)	0	0	1	1
9	India (IND)	0	0	1	1
9	Philippines (PHI)	0	0	1	1
Totals (11 entries)		24	27	53	104

== Results ==
=== Men's freestyle ===
==== 55 kg ====
19 September

1/8 finals
Bekzat Tynchtykbek Uulu (KGZ)
Tagantäç Güýçmämmedow (TKM)	Fall
Muhammad Shahid (PAK)	Fall
Ali Khalili (IRI)

Quarterfinals
Didar Satbayev (KAZ)	7
Muhammad Saeed Anwar (PAK)	3
Khusan Nosirov (UZB)
Mälik Annabaýew (TKM)	Fall
Oyatullo Khojaev (TJK)	6
Teppei Hatano (JPN)	0
Tagantäç Güýçmämmedow (TKM)	6
Muhammad Shahid (PAK)	2

Semifinals
Didar Satbayev (KAZ)	0
Mälik Annabaýew (TKM)	6
Oyatullo Khojaev (TJK)	2
Tagantäç Güýçmämmedow (TKM)	6

Final
Mälik Annabaýew (TKM)	1
Tagantäç Güýçmämmedow (TKM)	6

==== 60 kg ====
19 September

1/8 finals
Abdurasul Khabibullaev (UZB)	Fall
Mehrzod Sufiev (TJK)
Nurlan Sadyraly Uulu (KGZ)	Fall
Alvin Lobreguito (PHI)
Santikumar Singh (IND)
Rana Muhammad Adnan (PAK)	Fall
Raiymbek Rantayev (KAZ)	0
Agageldi Tagandurdyýew (TKM)	6

Quarterfinals
Ibodullo Aliberdizoda (TJK)	6
Erlanbek Murzabekov (KGZ)	0
Arslan Aşyrgeldiýew (TKM)	Fall
Ghasem Norouzi (IRI)
Abdurasul Khabibullaev (UZB)	Fall
Nurlan Sadyraly Uulu (KGZ)
Rana Muhammad Adnan (PAK)	0
Agageldi Tagandurdyýew (TKM)	6

Semifinals
Ibodullo Aliberdizoda (TJK)	4
Arslan Aşyrgeldiýew (TKM)	7
Abdurasul Khabibullaev (UZB)	0
Agageldi Tagandurdyýew (TKM)	6

Final
Arslan Aşyrgeldiýew (TKM)	WO
Agageldi Tagandurdyýew (TKM)

==== 65 kg ====
19 September

1/8 finals
Shahzad Khan (PAK)	4
Enkhtaivany Enkhbold (MGL)	7
Nasser Ghorbanpour (IRI)
Elbek Sotvoldiev (UZB)	Fall
Dustan Islam Uulu (KGZ)	Fall
Khudoyor Rajabzoda (TJK)
Adilet Shalgynbekuly (KAZ)
Begenç Ýagmyrow (TKM)	Fall

Quarterfinals
Jhonny Morte (PHI)
Tirkişgeldi Aýazow (TKM)	Fall
Niranjan Karlekar (IND)	2
Erkinbek Abdunabiev (TJK)	6
Enkhtaivany Enkhbold (MGL)	0
Elbek Sotvoldiev (UZB)	7
Dustan Islam Uulu (KGZ)
Begenç Ýagmyrow (TKM)	Fall

Semifinals
Tirkişgeldi Aýazow (TKM)	Fall
Erkinbek Abdunabiev (TJK)
Elbek Sotvoldiev (UZB)
Begenç Ýagmyrow (TKM)	Fall

Final
Tirkişgeldi Aýazow (TKM)
Begenç Ýagmyrow (TKM)	Fall

==== 70 kg ====
19 September

1/8 finals
Ýagşymyrat Annamyradow (TKM)	6
Madaminbek Sharshenaly Uulu (KGZ)	3
Akramkhuja Toshmurotov (TJK)	6
Dauren Damen (KAZ)	2
Irlan Kazbek Uulu (KGZ)
Rozymyrat Medow (TKM)	DQ
Muhammadghufron Toshzoda (TJK)	7
Tatsuma Kurosaki (JPN)	2
Joseph Angana (PHI)	0
Nasir Ahmad Akrami (AFG)	9
Husnidin Ruziev (UZB)	7
Mohammad Gholami (IRI)	0

Quarterfinals
Muhammad Sharif (PAK)	3
Dharmender (IND)	7
Ýagşymyrat Annamyradow (TKM)	WD
Akramkhuja Toshmurotov (TJK)
Rozymyrat Medow (TKM)	Fall
Muhammadghufron Toshzoda (TJK)
Nasir Ahmad Akrami (AFG)
Husnidin Ruziev (UZB)	Fall

Semifinals
Dharmender (IND)
Ýagşymyrat Annamyradow (TKM)	Fall
Rozymyrat Medow (TKM)	4
Husnidin Ruziev (UZB)	7

Final
Ýagşymyrat Annamyradow (TKM)	Fall
Husnidin Ruziev (UZB)

==== 80 kg ====
19 September

1/8 finals
Bekturkan Kozhomuratov (KGZ)	2
Aidos Kulmanbetov (KAZ)	6
Mulohuseyn Safarzoda (TJK)
Silapberdi Nuryýew (TKM)	Fall
Venuzo Dawhuo (IND)	6
Nasimshah Sakhizada (AFG)	3
Daisuke Fukagawa (JPN)
Ruslan Tavaldiev (KGZ)	Fall
Yaser Mohammadi (IRI)	Fall
Mekangeldi Berdiýew (TKM)
Kamoliddin Makhkamov (UZB)	7
Ruziboi Safarov (TJK)	0

Quarterfinals
Hafeez Ullah (PAK)	0
Eldor Nematov (UZB)	6
Aidos Kulmanbetov (KAZ)
Silapberdi Nuryýew (TKM)	Fall
Venuzo Dawhuo (IND)
Ruslan Tavaldiev (KGZ)	Fall
Yaser Mohammadi (IRI)	Fall
Kamoliddin Makhkamov (UZB)

Semifinals
Eldor Nematov (UZB)	0
Silapberdi Nuryýew (TKM)	6
Ruslan Tavaldiev (KGZ)	7
Yaser Mohammadi (IRI)	5

Final
Silapberdi Nuryýew (TKM)	3
Ruslan Tavaldiev (KGZ)	1

==== 90 kg ====
19 September

1/8 finals
Gylyç Jumaýew (TKM)	Fall
Abdukakhkhor Egamov (UZB)
Dostonbek Pochoev (TJK)	Fall
Visevo Zashumo (IND)
Christof Hofmann (PHI)
Davoud Avazzadeh (IRI)	Fall
Muhammad Adnan (PAK)	7
Keduovilie Zumu (IND)	1
Nurbek Kozhobekov (KGZ)
Arslan Ybraýymgulyýew (TKM)	3C
Khurshed Sharipov (TJK)	0
Obidali Mavlonov (UZB)	2

Quarterfinals
Kairat Mamatzakirov (KGZ)
Yersultan Muzapparov (KAZ)	Fall
Gylyç Jumaýew (TKM)	7
Dostonbek Pochoev (TJK)	2
Davoud Avazzadeh (IRI)	Fall
Muhammad Adnan (PAK)
Arslan Ybraýymgulyýew (TKM)	Fall
Obidali Mavlonov (UZB)

Semifinals
Yersultan Muzapparov (KAZ)	Fall
Gylyç Jumaýew (TKM)
Davoud Avazzadeh (IRI)
Arslan Ybraýymgulyýew (TKM)	Fall

Final
Yersultan Muzapparov (KAZ)
Arslan Ybraýymgulyýew (TKM)	Fall

==== 100 kg ====
19 September

1/8 finals
Muslem Khalil (AFG)	0
Hoşgeldi Hanaýew (TKM)	6
Abdollah Eiri (IRI)
Kadyr Kelsinbekov (KGZ)	Fall
Abdusalom Salomov (TJK)	Fall
Baataryn Batbold (MGL)
Tilek Kuralov (KGZ)
Bekbol Nurlanuly (KAZ)	Fall
Tayab Raza (PAK)
Seýdi Batyrow (TKM)	Fall
Dostonbek Yoriev (TJK)	7
Surhoneyi Soho (IND)	4
Nazir Ahmad Hossaini (AFG)	Fall
Nuritdin Makhamadov (UZB)

Quarterfinals
Islomjon Kuldashev (UZB)
Hoşgeldi Hanaýew (TKM)	Fall
Kadyr Kelsinbekov (KGZ)	Fall
Abdusalom Salomov (TJK)
Bekbol Nurlanuly (KAZ)	0
Seýdi Batyrow (TKM)	6
Dostonbek Yoriev (TJK)
Nazir Ahmad Hossaini (AFG)	Fall

Semifinals
Hoşgeldi Hanaýew (TKM)	Fall
Kadyr Kelsinbekov (KGZ)
Seýdi Batyrow (TKM)	Fall
Nazir Ahmad Hossaini (AFG)

Final
Hoşgeldi Hanaýew (TKM)	1
Seýdi Batyrow (TKM)	4

==== +100 kg ====
19 September

1/8 finals
Odiljon Suyunov (UZB)	1
Mahmad Mirov (TJK)	6
Abdolvahed Mohammadi (IRI)	0
Iliias Nishanov (KGZ)	1
Menuosetuo Yiese (IND)
Myrat Jumaýew (TKM)	Fall
Gongoryn Pürevbaatar (MGL)	1
Zunair Bin Zahir (PAK)	0

Quarterfinals
Vechita Khesoh (IND)
Muhammad Basit (PAK)	Fall
Rejepaly Orazalyýew (TKM)
Sherzodjon Rakhimov (UZB)	Fall
Mahmad Mirov (TJK)
Iliias Nishanov (KGZ)	Fall
Myrat Jumaýew (TKM)	5
Gongoryn Pürevbaatar (MGL)	3

Semifinals
Muhammad Basit (PAK)
Sherzodjon Rakhimov (UZB)	Fall
Iliias Nishanov (KGZ)	0
Myrat Jumaýew (TKM)	3

Final
Sherzodjon Rakhimov (UZB)
Myrat Jumaýew (TKM)	Fall

- Rejepaly Orazalyýew of Turkmenistan originally finished fifth, but was disqualified after he tested positive for Oxandrolone.

=== Men's classic style ===
==== 55 kg ====
20 September

1/8 finals
Myrathan Azadow (TKM)	6
Michael Jay Cater (PHI)	0

Quarterfinals
Muhammad Saeed Anwar (PAK)
Khusan Nosirov (UZB)	Fall
Ali Khalili (IRI)
Sapa Jumaýew (TKM)	Fall
Muhammad Shahid (PAK)	0
Bekzat Tynchtykbek Uulu (KGZ)	7
Berikbol Muratkhan (KAZ)
Myrathan Azadow (TKM)	Fall

Semifinals
Khusan Nosirov (UZB)	5
Sapa Jumaýew (TKM)	6
Bekzat Tynchtykbek Uulu (KGZ)	7
Myrathan Azadow (TKM)	0

Final
Sapa Jumaýew (TKM)	5
Bekzat Tynchtykbek Uulu (KGZ)	7

==== 60 kg ====
20 September

1/8 finals
Raiymbek Rantayev (KAZ)
Mehrzod Sufiev (TJK)	Fall
Fayzulla Ummatov (UZB)	Fall
Ghasem Norouzi (IRI)
Amol Hariba Sathe (IND)
Enkhtaivany Enkhbold (MGL)	Fall
Medet Hallygurbanow (TKM)	Fall
Abdurasul Khabibullaev (UZB)

Quarterfinals
Dildar Hussain (PAK)	1
Erlanbek Murzabekov (KGZ)	6
Agajan Täçmuhammedow (TKM)	Fall
Dnyaneshwar Tulshiram Bhoi (IND)
Mehrzod Sufiev (TJK)
Fayzulla Ummatov (UZB)	Fall
Enkhtaivany Enkhbold (MGL)
Medet Hallygurbanow (TKM)	Fall

Semifinals
Erlanbek Murzabekov (KGZ)	6
Agajan Täçmuhammedow (TKM)	0
Fayzulla Ummatov (UZB)
Medet Hallygurbanow (TKM)	Fall

Final
Erlanbek Murzabekov (KGZ)	1
Medet Hallygurbanow (TKM)	3

==== 65 kg ====
20 September

Quarterfinals
Rüstemgeldi Agageldiýew (TKM)	Fall
Jonathan Maquilan (PHI)
Agamyrat Orazsähedow (TKM)	6
Esmaeil Amiri (IRI)	3
Vikramjit Singh (IND)	2
Muhammad Safdar (PAK)	5

Semifinals
Khudoyor Rajabzoda (TJK)	1
Rüstemgeldi Agageldiýew (TKM)	6
Agamyrat Orazsähedow (TKM)	Fall
Muhammad Safdar (PAK)

Final
Rüstemgeldi Agageldiýew (TKM)	0
Agamyrat Orazsähedow (TKM)	6

==== 70 kg ====
20 September

1/8 finals
Audumbar Maruti Kokare (IND)
Madaminbek Sharshenaly Uulu (KGZ)	Fall
Akramkhuja Toshmurotov (TJK)
Husnidin Ruziev (UZB)	Fall
Mohammad Gholami (IRI)	7
Auyezkhan Kurbankulov (KAZ)	0
Orazmyrat Orazmyradow (TKM)	Fall
Romen Singh Tongbram (IND)
Ilkhomjon Mashrabov (UZB)	Fall
Muhammadghufron Toshzoda (TJK)

Quarterfinals
Hangeldi Allakow (TKM)	6
Nasir Ahmad Akrami (AFG)	4
Hassan Mahmood (PAK)	0
Madaminbek Sharshenaly Uulu (KGZ)	6
Husnidin Ruziev (UZB)	Fall
Mohammad Gholami (IRI)
Orazmyrat Orazmyradow (TKM)	Fall
Ilkhomjon Mashrabov (UZB)

Semifinals
Hangeldi Allakow (TKM)	Fall
Madaminbek Sharshenaly Uulu (KGZ)
Husnidin Ruziev (UZB)	Fall
Orazmyrat Orazmyradow (TKM)

Final
Hangeldi Allakow (TKM)	1
Husnidin Ruziev (UZB)	8

==== 80 kg ====
20 September

1/8 finals
Nasimshah Sakhizada (AFG)	Fall
Ruziboi Safarov (TJK)
Aidos Kulmanbetov (KAZ)	6
Ayan Sinha (IND)	0
Muhammetmyrat Gurbanow (TKM)	6
Zhanybek Allakulov (KGZ)	3
Kishor Mahadeo Gole (IND)
Jefferson Manatad (PHI)	Fall

Quarterfinals
Eldor Nematov (UZB)	7
Mekangeldi Berdiýew (TKM)	5
Mohabat Ali Drigh (PAK)	0
Yaser Mohammadi (IRI)	7
Nasimshah Sakhizada (AFG)
Aidos Kulmanbetov (KAZ)	Fall
Muhammetmyrat Gurbanow (TKM)	2
Jefferson Manatad (PHI)	8

Semifinals
Eldor Nematov (UZB)	6
Yaser Mohammadi (IRI)	1
Aidos Kulmanbetov (KAZ)	Fall
Jefferson Manatad (PHI)

Final
Eldor Nematov (UZB)	3
Aidos Kulmanbetov (KAZ)	7

==== 90 kg ====
20 September

1/8 finals
Obidali Mavlonov (UZB)	Fall
Christof Hofmann (PHI)
Sherikbai Amanilla Uulu (KGZ)
Gylyç Jumaýew (TKM)	Fall
Yersultan Muzapparov (KAZ)	6
Hamed Mirzapour (IRI)	0
Khurshed Sharipov (TJK)	Fall
Kulwinder Singh (IND)

Quarterfinals
Mohsin Raza (PAK)
Dostonbek Pochoev (TJK)	Fall
Atul Suresh Shirole (IND)	0
Öwezgeldi Berdiýew (TKM)	6
Obidali Mavlonov (UZB)	2
Gylyç Jumaýew (TKM)	1
Yersultan Muzapparov (KAZ)	1
Khurshed Sharipov (TJK)	1

Semifinals
Dostonbek Pochoev (TJK)	0
Öwezgeldi Berdiýew (TKM)	7
Obidali Mavlonov (UZB)	Fall
Yersultan Muzapparov (KAZ)

Final
Öwezgeldi Berdiýew (TKM)	1
Obidali Mavlonov (UZB)	7

==== 100 kg ====
20 September

1/8 finals
Abdusalom Salomov (TJK)
Islomjon Kuldashev (UZB)	Fall
Baataryn Batbold (MGL)	0
Mahmoud Parvaneh (IRI)	3

Quarterfinals
Seýdi Batyrow (TKM)	Fall
Atul Vasant Ghule (IND)
Orozbek Ashirov (KGZ)	Fall
Swapnil Balu Phule (IND)
Altymuhammet Ýegenow (TKM)	4
Bekbol Nurlanuly (KAZ)	4
Islomjon Kuldashev (UZB)	4
Mahmoud Parvaneh (IRI)	0

Semifinals
Seýdi Batyrow (TKM)	6
Orozbek Ashirov (KGZ)	0
Bekbol Nurlanuly (KAZ)
Islomjon Kuldashev (UZB)	WD

Final
Seýdi Batyrow (TKM)	Fall
Islomjon Kuldashev (UZB)

==== +100 kg ====
20 September

1/8 finals
Asylbek Khalmatov (KGZ)	1
Ahal Ballarow (TKM)	1
Zunair Bin Zahir (PAK)	0
Gongoryn Pürevbaatar (MGL)	1

Quarterfinals
Myrat Jumaýew (TKM)	1
Sherzodjon Rakhimov (UZB)	1
Altaf Mabusab Mulla (IND)
Mahmad Mirov (TJK)	Fall
Habib Gholampour (IRI)	0
Odiljon Suyunov (UZB)	4
Ahal Ballarow (TKM)	4
Gongoryn Pürevbaatar (MGL)	1

Semifinals
Sherzodjon Rakhimov (UZB)	4
Mahmad Mirov (TJK)	1
Odiljon Suyunov (UZB)	0
Ahal Ballarow (TKM)	6

Final
Sherzodjon Rakhimov (UZB)	5
Ahal Ballarow (TKM)	3

=== Women's freestyle ===
==== 50 kg ====
19 September

1/8 finals
Hesel Bekiýewa (TKM)	Fall
Humaira Ashiq (PAK)
Leila Siahvashi (IRI)	0
Shakhzoda Ergasheva (UZB)	6

Quarterfinals
Laçyn Badaglyýewa (TKM)	3
Botagoz Dyussembayeva (KAZ)	0
Grace Loberanes (PHI)	1
Maryam (PAK)	2
Rani Laxman Jagtap (IND)
Manzuraoy Muydinova (UZB)	Fall
Hesel Bekiýewa (TKM)	1
Shakhzoda Ergasheva (UZB)	1

Semifinals
Laçyn Badaglyýewa (TKM)	6
Maryam (PAK)	0
Manzuraoy Muydinova (UZB)	3
Shakhzoda Ergasheva (UZB)	3

Final
Laçyn Badaglyýewa (TKM)	4
Shakhzoda Ergasheva (UZB)	4

==== 55 kg ====
19 September

1/8 finals
Zahra Yazdani (IRI)	Fall
Merjen Inatyllaýewa (TKM)

Quarterfinals
Zarina Abdyrahmanowa (TKM)	6
Ambreen Masih (PAK)	0
Shamal Sunil Belgaonkar (IND)
Anara Ryskulova (KGZ)	Fall
Gulkhumoroy Dadaboeva (UZB)	Fall
Pallavi Bhat (IND)
Ulzhan Dyussembayeva (KAZ)
Zahra Yazdani (IRI)	Fall

Semifinals
Zarina Abdyrahmanowa (TKM)	1
Anara Ryskulova (KGZ)	0
Gulkhumoroy Dadaboeva (UZB)	4
Zahra Yazdani (IRI)	4

Final
Zarina Abdyrahmanowa (TKM)	7
Zahra Yazdani (IRI)	2

==== 60 kg ====
19 September

Pos	Athlete	Pld	W	L	CP	TKM	TKM	IRI	KGZ	PHI
1	Zuhra Madraimowa (TKM)	4	4	0	19	—	Fall	Fall	7–0	Fall
2	Roza Taşpulatowa (TKM)	4	3	1	11	0–5 VF	—	3–1	3–3	Fall
3	Zahra Mahmoudi (IRI)	4	2	2	11	0–5 VF	1–3 VQ	—	Fall	Fall
4	Meerim Momunova (KGZ)	4	1	3	6	0–4 VP	1–3 VQ	0–5 VF	—	Fall
5	Noemi Tener (PHI)	4	0	4	0	0–5 VF	0–5 VF	0–5 VF	0–5 VF	—

Source: UWW

==== 65 kg ====
19 September

Quarterfinals
Dinara Hallyýewa (TKM)	Fall
Khavaskhon Jurakuzieva (UZB)
Leila Salarvand (IRI)
Dilafruz Mamadjonova (UZB)	Fall
Kumushai Attokur Kyzy (KGZ)
Gülnar Haýytbaýewa (TKM)	Fall

Semifinals
Uulkan Alibai Kyzy (KGZ)	2
Dinara Hallyýewa (TKM)	6
Dilafruz Mamadjonova (UZB)
Gülnar Haýytbaýewa (TKM)	Fall

Final
Dinara Hallyýewa (TKM)	DQ
Gülnar Haýytbaýewa (TKM)

- Dinara Hallyýewa of Turkmenistan originally won the gold medal, but was disqualified after she tested positive for Meldonium.
- Gülnar Haýytbaýewa of Turkmenistan originally won the silver medal, but was disqualified after she tested positive for Methylhexaneamine and 1,3-Dimethylbutylamine.

==== 70 kg ====
19 September

1/8 finals
Mönkh-Erdeniin Bayartuul (MGL)	1
Gulmira Ismatova (UZB)	3
Divya Guruling Shilwant (IND)
Nurzat Baktyiar Kyzy (KGZ)	Fall
Perizat Zhakypbekova (KAZ)	2
Rano Uzakowa (TKM)	0

Quarterfinals
Upasana Vishwakarma (IND)
Nasiba Surkiýewa (TKM)	Fall
Mariya Sedunova (TJK)	0
Beenish Khan (PAK)	3
Zahra Majdi (IRI)	6
Gulmira Ismatova (UZB)	4
Nurzat Baktyiar Kyzy (KGZ)	2
Perizat Zhakypbekova (KAZ)	3

Semifinals
Nasiba Surkiýewa (TKM)	6
Beenish Khan (PAK)	1
Zahra Majdi (IRI)	0
Perizat Zhakypbekova (KAZ)	7

Final
Nasiba Surkiýewa (TKM)	Fall
Perizat Zhakypbekova (KAZ)

- Nasiba Surkiýewa of Turkmenistan originally won the gold medal, but was disqualified after she tested positive for Methylhexaneamine and 1,3-Dimethylbutylamine.

==== +70 kg ====
19 September

1/8 finals
Saeideh Rahimi (IRI)	3
Sakhobat Sheralieva (UZB)	2

Quarterfinals
Pratiksha Chandrakant Parhar (IND)
Nazira Arzybekova (KGZ)	Fall
Otgony Mönkhtsetseg (MGL)	7
Maksuda Egemberdiýewa (TKM)	0
Nyamkhüügiin Nyamtuyaa (MGL)	4
Altynai Mamarasul Kyzy (KGZ)	6
Jahan Muhammedowa (TKM)	0
Saeideh Rahimi (IRI)	3

Semifinals
Nazira Arzybekova (KGZ)	0
Otgony Mönkhtsetseg (MGL)	6
Altynai Mamarasul Kyzy (KGZ)	6
Saeideh Rahimi (IRI)	0

Final
Otgony Mönkhtsetseg (MGL)	6
Altynai Mamarasul Kyzy (KGZ)	0

=== Women's classic style ===
==== 50 kg ====
20 September

1/8 finals
Botagoz Dyussembayeva (KAZ)	1
Aýjemal Alymowa (TKM)	1
Maryam (PAK)
Manzuraoy Muydinova (UZB)	Fall
Laçyn Badaglyýewa (TKM)	Fall
Shamal Sunil Belgaonkar (IND)

Quarterfinals
Leila Siahvashi (IRI)	Fall
Rani Laxman Jagtap (IND)
Shakhzoda Ergasheva (UZB)	Fall
Grace Loberanes (PHI)
Humaira Ashiq (PAK)	2
Aýjemal Alymowa (TKM)	1
Manzuraoy Muydinova (UZB)
Laçyn Badaglyýewa (TKM)	Fall

Semifinals
Leila Siahvashi (IRI)	1
Shakhzoda Ergasheva (UZB)	3
Humaira Ashiq (PAK)
Laçyn Badaglyýewa (TKM)	Fall

Final
Shakhzoda Ergasheva (UZB)	4
Laçyn Badaglyýewa (TKM)	8

==== 55 kg ====
20 September

Quarterfinals
Zahra Yazdani (IRI)
Zarina Abdyrahmanowa (TKM)	Fall
Pallavi Bhat (IND)
Gulfiýa Jumaýewa (TKM)	Fall

Semifinals
Meerim Miizamidin Kyzy (KGZ)	5
Ambreen Masih (PAK)	3
Zarina Abdyrahmanowa (TKM)	7
Gulfiýa Jumaýewa (TKM)	0

Final
Meerim Miizamidin Kyzy (KGZ)
Zarina Abdyrahmanowa (TKM)	Fall

==== 60 kg ====
20 September

Pos	Athlete	Pld	W	L	CP	TKM	KGZ	TKM	PHI	IRI
1	Zuhra Madraimowa (TKM)	4	4	0	18	—	3–1	7–3	Fall	Fall
2	Meerim Momunova (KGZ)	4	2	2	11	1–4 VO	—	1–2	7–0	Fall
3	Roza Taşpulatowa (TKM)	4	2	2	10	1–4 VO	4–1 VO	—	1–3	6–0
4	Noemi Tener (PHI)	4	2	2	9	0–5 VF	0–4 VP	4–1 VO	—	Fall
5	Reihaneh Sheikhian (IRI)	4	0	4	0	0–5 VF	0–5 VF	0–4 VP	0–5 VF	—

Source: UWW

==== 65 kg ====
20 September

Quarterfinals
Sahar Ghanizadeh (IRI)
Dilafruz Mamadjonova (UZB)	Fall
Kumushai Attokur Kyzy (KGZ)	4
Dinara Hallyýewa (TKM)	4

Semifinals
Gülnar Haýytbaýewa (TKM)	Fall
Khavaskhon Jurakuzieva (UZB)
Dilafruz Mamadjonova (UZB)	3
Dinara Hallyýewa (TKM)	1

Final
Gülnar Haýytbaýewa (TKM)	7
Dilafruz Mamadjonova (UZB)	2

- Gülnar Haýytbaýewa of Turkmenistan originally won the gold medal, but was disqualified after she tested positive for Methylhexaneamine and 1,3-Dimethylbutylamine.
- Dinara Hallyýewa of Turkmenistan originally won the bronze medal, but was disqualified after she tested positive for Meldonium.

==== 70 kg ====
20 September

1/8 finals
Upasana Vishwakarma (IND)
Mariya Sedunova (TJK)	Fall
Gulmira Ismatova (UZB)	0
Nasiba Surkiýewa (TKM)	3

Quarterfinals
Beenish Khan (PAK)	Fall
Divya Guruling Shilwant (IND)
Rano Uzakowa (TKM)	0
Perizat Zhakypbekova (KAZ)	3
Mönkh-Erdeniin Bayartuul (MGL)	1
Nurzat Baktyiar Kyzy (KGZ)	1
Mariya Sedunova (TJK)
Nasiba Surkiýewa (TKM)	Fall

Semifinals
Beenish Khan (PAK)	0
Perizat Zhakypbekova (KAZ)	2
Nurzat Baktyiar Kyzy (KGZ)	0
Nasiba Surkiýewa (TKM)	2

Final
Perizat Zhakypbekova (KAZ)	0
Nasiba Surkiýewa (TKM)	1

- Nasiba Surkiýewa of Turkmenistan originally won the gold medal, but was disqualified after she tested positive for Methylhexaneamine and 1,3-Dimethylbutylamine.

==== +70 kg ====
20 September

1/8 finals
Nyamkhüügiin Nyamtuyaa (MGL)	1
Altynai Mamarasul Kyzy (KGZ)	1

Quarterfinals
Sakhobat Sheralieva (UZB)	1
Ganboldyn Sarangoo (MGL)	5
Maksuda Egemberdiýewa (TKM)	7
Nazira Arzybekova (KGZ)	4
Asieh Shojaei (IRI)	Fall
Pratiksha Chandrakant Parhar (IND)
Jahan Muhammedowa (TKM)	1
Altynai Mamarasul Kyzy (KGZ)	0

Semifinals
Ganboldyn Sarangoo (MGL)
Maksuda Egemberdiýewa (TKM)	Fall
Asieh Shojaei (IRI)	1
Jahan Muhammedowa (TKM)	1

Final
Maksuda Egemberdiýewa (TKM)	Fall
Jahan Muhammedowa (TKM)
