= Track cycling at the 2017 Asian Indoor and Martial Arts Games =

- Venue: Ashgabat Velodrome
- Dates: 18–23 September 2017

Track cycling at the 2017 Asian Indoor and Martial Arts Games took place at Ashgabat Velodrome, Ashgabat.

== Medalists ==
=== Men ===
Event	Gold	Silver	Bronze
Sprint	Pavel Vorzhev; Kazakhstan	Mohammad Daneshvar; Iran	Sergey Ponomaryov; Kazakhstan
Keirin	Pavel Vorzhev; Kazakhstan	Pongthep Tapimay; Thailand	Mohammad Daneshvar; Iran
Omnium	Leung Chun Wing; Hong Kong	Artyom Zakharov; Kazakhstan	Yousif Mirza; United Arab Emirates
Team sprint	Iran; Ali Aliasgari; Mohammad Daneshvar; Ehsan Khademi; Mahmoud Parash	Kazakhstan; Sergey Ponomaryov; Zaki Sultanov; Pavel Vorzhev	Thailand; Worayut Kapunya; Jaturong Niwanti; Satjakul Sianglam; Pongthep Tapimay
Team pursuit	Kazakhstan; Sultanmurat Miraliyev; Roman Vassilenkov; Artyom Zakharov; Alisher Zhumakan; Sergey Shatovkin	Hong Kong; Ko Siu Wai; Leung Chun Wing; Leung Ka Yu; Mow Ching Yin; Law Tsz Chun	Thailand; Turakit Boonratanathanakorn; Navuti Liphongyu; Yuttana Mano; Sarawut Sirironnachai

=== Women ===
Event	Gold	Silver	Bronze
Sprint	Lee Wai Sze; Hong Kong	Deborah Herold; India	Crismonita Dwi Putri; Indonesia
Keirin	Lee Wai Sze; Hong Kong	Deborah Herold; India	Ma Wing Yu; Hong Kong
Omnium	Diao Xiaojuan; Hong Kong	Jutatip Maneephan; Thailand	Phetdarin Somrat; Thailand
Team sprint	Hong Kong; Lee Wai Sze; Li Yin Yin; Ma Wing Yu	India; Deborah Herold; Alena Reji	Thailand; Watinee Luekajorn; Pannaray Rasee

== Medal table ==
Rank	Nation	Gold	Silver	Bronze	Total
1	Hong Kong (HKG)	5	1	1	7
2	Kazakhstan (KAZ)	3	2	1	6
3	Iran (IRI)	1	1	1	3
4	India (IND)	0	3	0	3
5	Thailand (THA)	0	2	4	6
6	Indonesia (INA)	0	0	1	1
6	United Arab Emirates (UAE)	0	0	1	1
Totals (7 entries)		9	9	9	27

== Results ==
=== Men ===
==== Sprint ====
===== Qualifying =====
20 September

Rank	Athlete	Time
1	Mohammad Daneshvar (IRI)	10.164
2	Pavel Vorzhev (KAZ)	10.178
3	Sergey Ponomaryov (KAZ)	10.310
4	Ali Aliasgari (IRI)	10.560
5	Pongthep Tapimay (THA)	10.569
6	Law Tsz Chun (HKG)	10.636
7	Ranjit Singh (IND)	10.667
8	Puguh Admadi (INA)	10.801
9	Leung Chun Long (HKG)	10.925
10	Mohammed Al-Mushaykhis (KSA)	10.955
11	Sahil Kumar (IND)	10.983
12	Abdulaziz Al-Khuwaytim (KSA)	11.047
13	Reno Yudho Sansaka (INA)	11.056
14	Thanawat Uraikit (THA)	11.330
15	Mohammed Al-Mansoori (UAE)	11.515
16	Nasser Al-Memari (UAE)	11.687
17	Muhammetresul Hashojaýew (TKM)	12.185
18	Oraz Gaýypow (TKM)	12.480
19	Jalol Rahimov (TJK)	13.566
20	Amindzhon Salomov (TJK)	13.997

===== 1/16 finals =====
20 September

Rank	Athlete	Time
Heat 1
1	Mohammad Daneshvar (IRI)	11.779
2	Oraz Gaýypow (TKM)	
Heat 2
1	Pavel Vorzhev (KAZ)	11.333
2	Muhammetresul Hashojaýew (TKM)	
Heat 3
1	Sergey Ponomaryov (KAZ)	12.145
2	Nasser Al-Memari (UAE)	
Heat 4
1	Ali Aliasgari (IRI)	14.779
2	Mohammed Al-Mansoori (UAE)	
Heat 5
1	Pongthep Tapimay (THA)	12.262
2	Thanawat Uraikit (THA)	
Heat 6
1	Reno Yudho Sansaka (INA)	10.983
2	Law Tsz Chun (HKG)	
Heat 7
1	Ranjit Singh (IND)	10.923
2	Abdulaziz Al-Khuwaytim (KSA)	
Heat 8
1	Puguh Admadi (INA)	11.620
2	Sahil Kumar (IND)	
Heat 9
1	Leung Chun Long (HKG)	11.558
2	Mohammed Al-Mushaykhis (KSA)	

===== 1/16 finals repechage =====
20 September

Rank	Athlete	Time
Heat 1
1	Law Tsz Chun (HKG)	11.127
2	Mohammed Al-Mushaykhis (KSA)	
3	Oraz Gaýypow (TKM)	
Heat 2
1	Abdulaziz Al-Khuwaytim (KSA)	11.211
2	Thanawat Uraikit (THA)	
3	Muhammetresul Hashojaýew (TKM)	
Heat 3
1	Sahil Kumar (IND)	
2	Nasser Al-Memari (UAE)	
3	Mohammed Al-Mansoori (UAE)	REL

===== 1/8 finals =====
20 September

Rank	Athlete	Time
Heat 1
1	Mohammad Daneshvar (IRI)	11.081
2	Sahil Kumar (IND)	
Heat 2
1	Pavel Vorzhev (KAZ)	10.614
2	Abdulaziz Al-Khuwaytim (KSA)	
Heat 3
1	Sergey Ponomaryov (KAZ)	10.984
2	Law Tsz Chun (HKG)	
Heat 4
1	Ali Aliasgari (IRI)	11.310
2	Leung Chun Long (HKG)	
Heat 5
1	Pongthep Tapimay (THA)	11.234
2	Puguh Admadi (INA)	
Heat 6
1	Ranjit Singh (IND)	11.040
2	Reno Yudho Sansaka (INA)	

===== 1/8 finals repechage =====
20 September

Rank	Athlete	Time
Heat 1
1	Reno Yudho Sansaka (INA)	11.085
2	Leung Chun Long (HKG)	
3	Sahil Kumar (IND)	
Heat 2
1	Law Tsz Chun (HKG)	11.220
2	Puguh Admadi (INA)	
3	Abdulaziz Al-Khuwaytim (KSA)	

===== Quarterfinals =====
21 September

Rank	Athlete	1st	2nd	3rd
Heat 1
1	Mohammad Daneshvar (IRI)	10.954	10.874	
2	Law Tsz Chun (HKG)			
Heat 2
1	Pavel Vorzhev (KAZ)	10.921	10.907	
2	Reno Yudho Sansaka (INA)			
Heat 3
1	Sergey Ponomaryov (KAZ)			
2	Ranjit Singh (IND)	DNS	DNS	
Heat 4
1	Ali Aliasgari (IRI)	11.019	REL	10.918
2	Pongthep Tapimay (THA)		11.170	

===== Semifinals =====
21 September

Rank	Athlete	1st	2nd	3rd
Heat 1
1	Mohammad Daneshvar (IRI)	10.662	12.188	
2	Ali Aliasgari (IRI)			
Heat 2
1	Pavel Vorzhev (KAZ)	10.635	10.818	
2	Sergey Ponomaryov (KAZ)			

===== Finals =====
22 September

Rank	Athlete	1st	2nd	3rd
For gold
1st place, gold medalist(s)	Pavel Vorzhev (KAZ)	10.559	10.478	
2nd place, silver medalist(s)	Mohammad Daneshvar (IRI)			
For bronze
3rd place, bronze medalist(s)	Sergey Ponomaryov (KAZ)	10.857	10.773	
4	Ali Aliasgari (IRI)			

==== Keirin ====
23 September

===== 1st round =====
Rank	Athlete	Notes
Heat 1
1	Mohammad Daneshvar (IRI)	
2	Pongthep Tapimay (THA)	
3	Mohammed Al-Mansoori (UAE)	
4	Reno Yudho Sansaka (INA)	
5	Ahmed Al-Hassan (KSA)	
6	Mok Ho San (HKG)	
Heat 2
1	Zaki Sultanov (KAZ)	
2	Mahmoud Parash (IRI)	
3	Satjakul Sianglam (THA)	
4	Puguh Admadi (INA)	
5	Arazmuhammet Nurmedow (TKM)	
—	Ranjit Singh (IND)	DNF
—	Jalol Rahimov (TJK)	DNS
Heat 3
1	Pavel Vorzhev (KAZ)	
2	Nasser Al-Memari (UAE)	
3	Leung Chun Long (HKG)	
4	Abdulaziz Al-Khuwaytim (KSA)	
—	Sahil Kumar (IND)	REL
—	Muhammetresul Hashojaýew (TKM)	DSQ
—	Amindzhon Salomov (TJK)	DNS

===== First round repechage =====
Rank	Athlete	Notes
Heat 1
1	Abdulaziz Al-Khuwaytim (KSA)	
2	Puguh Admadi (INA)	
3	Mohammed Al-Mansoori (UAE)	
4	Mok Ho San (HKG)	
5	Arazmuhammet Nurmedow (TKM)	
Heat 2
1	Satjakul Sianglam (THA)	
2	Leung Chun Long (HKG)	
3	Ahmed Al-Hassan (KSA)	
4	Sahil Kumar (IND)	
5	Reno Yudho Sansaka (INA)	
6	Ranjit Singh (IND)	

===== 2nd round =====
Rank	Athlete	Notes
Heat 1
1	Mohammad Daneshvar (IRI)	
2	Mahmoud Parash (IRI)	
3	Satjakul Sianglam (THA)	
4	Puguh Admadi (INA)	
5	Ahmed Al-Hassan (KSA)	
6	Nasser Al-Memari (UAE)	
Heat 2
1	Zaki Sultanov (KAZ)	
2	Pavel Vorzhev (KAZ)	
3	Pongthep Tapimay (THA)	
4	Mohammed Al-Mansoori (UAE)	
5	Leung Chun Long (HKG)	
6	Abdulaziz Al-Khuwaytim (KSA)	

===== Finals =====
Rank	Athlete	Notes
Final 1–6
1st place, gold medalist(s)	Pavel Vorzhev (KAZ)	
2nd place, silver medalist(s)	Pongthep Tapimay (THA)	
3rd place, bronze medalist(s)	Mohammad Daneshvar (IRI)	
4	Mahmoud Parash (IRI)	
5	Zaki Sultanov (KAZ)	
6	Satjakul Sianglam (THA)	
Final 7–12
7	Leung Chun Long (HKG)	
8	Mohammed Al-Mansoori (UAE)	
9	Abdulaziz Al-Khuwaytim (KSA)	
10	Nasser Al-Memari (UAE)	
11	Puguh Admadi (INA)	
12	Ahmed Al-Hassan (KSA)	

==== Omnium ====
23 September

Rank	Athlete	Scratch race	Tempo race	Elim. race	Points race	Total
1st place, gold medalist(s)	Leung Chun Wing (HKG)	36	38	38	35	147
2nd place, silver medalist(s)	Artyom Zakharov (KAZ)	40	36	36	27	139
3rd place, bronze medalist(s)	Yousif Mirza (UAE)	38	34	40	19	131
4	Mohammad Ganjkhanloo (IRI)	28	32	30	32	122
5	Sultan Assiri (KSA)	32	40	26	0	98
6	Leung Ka Yu (HKG)	34	28	32	3	97
7	Ruslan Fedorov (UZB)	26	26	22	9	83
8	Lao Long San (MAC)	20	22	18	23	83
9	Andrey Izmaylov (UZB)	16	30	28	3	77
10	Turakit Boonratanathanakorn (THA)	18	20	34	1	73
11	Hassan Al-Jumah (KSA)	22	16	20	2	60
12	Akmyrat Hojagulyýew (TKM)	24	14	16	1	55
13	Patompob Phonarjthan (THA)	14	18	14	6	52
14	Yhlas Öwezmyradow (TKM)	10	12	10	0	32
15	Arnold Marcelo (PHI)	−40	10	12	−200	−218
—	Sultanmurat Miraliyev (KAZ)	30	DNF			DNF
—	Ahmed Al-Mansoori (UAE)	12	24	24	DSQ	DSQ
—	Jalol Rahimov (TJK)					DNS
—	Amindzhon Salomov (TJK)					DNS

==== Team sprint ====
18 September

===== Qualifying =====
Rank	Team	Time
1	Kazakhstan (KAZ)	45.788
2	Iran (IRI)	46.758
3	Thailand (THA)	46.991
4	India (IND)	47.292
5	Hong Kong (HKG)	47.897
6	Saudi Arabia (KSA)	48.409
7	United Arab Emirates (UAE)	50.080
8	Turkmenistan (TKM)	50.484

===== 1st round =====
Rank	Team	Time
Heat 1
1	India (IND)	47.560
2	Hong Kong (HKG)	47.763
Heat 2
1	Thailand (THA)	46.391
2	Saudi Arabia (KSA)	REL
Heat 3
1	Iran (IRI)	45.245
2	United Arab Emirates (UAE)	49.917
Heat 4
1	Kazakhstan (KAZ)	45.405
2	Turkmenistan (TKM)	50.427

===== Finals =====
Rank	Team	Time
For gold
1st place, gold medalist(s)	Iran (IRI)	45.535
2nd place, silver medalist(s)	Kazakhstan (KAZ)	45.588
For bronze
3rd place, bronze medalist(s)	Thailand (THA)	46.920
4	India (IND)	47.421

==== Team pursuit ====
===== Qualifying =====
19 September

Rank	Team	Time
1	Kazakhstan (KAZ)	4:07.984
2	Hong Kong (HKG)	4:17.603
3	United Arab Emirates (UAE)	4:21.724
4	Uzbekistan (UZB)	4:22.545
5	Thailand (THA)	4:22.920
6	Saudi Arabia (KSA)	4:24.136
7	Turkmenistan (TKM)	4:34.727

===== 1st round =====
21 September

Rank	Team	Time
Heat 1
1	Saudi Arabia (KSA)	4:21.198
—	Turkmenistan (TKM)	DSQ
Heat 2
1	Thailand (THA)	4:18.164
Heat 3
1	Hong Kong (HKG)	4:12.950
2	United Arab Emirates (UAE)	4:19.668
Heat 4
1	Kazakhstan (KAZ)	4:09.439
2	Uzbekistan (UZB)	4:18.566

===== Finals =====
22 September

Rank	Team	Time
For gold
1st place, gold medalist(s)	Kazakhstan (KAZ)	4:05.362
2nd place, silver medalist(s)	Hong Kong (HKG)	4:13.337
For bronze
3rd place, bronze medalist(s)	Thailand (THA)	4:14.224
4	Uzbekistan (UZB)	4:24.078

=== Women ===
==== Sprint ====
===== Qualifying =====
19 September

Rank	Athlete	Time
1	Lee Wai Sze (HKG)	10.920
2	Ma Wing Yu (HKG)	11.666
3	Deborah Herold (IND)	11.773
4	Crismonita Dwi Putri (INA)	11.863
5	Watinee Luekajorn (THA)	12.121
6	Alena Reji (IND)	12.155
7	Pannaray Rasee (THA)	12.337
8	Fatemeh Hadavand (IRI)	12.599
9	Olga Jantuganova (UZB)	13.592

===== Quarterfinals =====
19 September

Rank	Athlete	1st	2nd	3rd
Heat 1
1	Lee Wai Sze (HKG)	12.267	12.437	
2	Fatemeh Hadavand (IRI)			
Heat 2
1	Ma Wing Yu (HKG)		11.989	11.965
2	Pannaray Rasee (THA)	12.434		
Heat 3
1	Deborah Herold (IND)	12.926	12.165	
2	Alena Reji (IND)			
Heat 4
1	Crismonita Dwi Putri (INA)	11.911	12.197	
2	Watinee Luekajorn (THA)			

===== Semifinals =====
20 September

Rank	Athlete	1st	2nd	3rd
Heat 1
1	Lee Wai Sze (HKG)	12.075	11.512	
2	Crismonita Dwi Putri (INA)			
Heat 2
1	Deborah Herold (IND)		12.205	11.835
2	Ma Wing Yu (HKG)	12.140		

===== Finals =====
20 September

Rank	Athlete	1st	2nd	3rd
For gold
1st place, gold medalist(s)	Lee Wai Sze (HKG)	12.526	11.694	
2nd place, silver medalist(s)	Deborah Herold (IND)			
For bronze
3rd place, bronze medalist(s)	Crismonita Dwi Putri (INA)	12.030	11.996	
4	Ma Wing Yu (HKG)			

==== Keirin ====
22 September

===== 1st round =====
Rank	Athlete	Notes
Heat 1
1	Lee Wai Sze (HKG)	
2	Alena Reji (IND)	
3	Fatemeh Hadavand (IRI)	
4	Watinee Luekajorn (THA)	
5	Ayustina Delia Priatna (INA)	
Heat 2
1	Ma Wing Yu (HKG)	
2	Ekaterina Knebeleva (UZB)	
3	Deborah Herold (IND)	
4	Crismonita Dwi Putri (INA)	
5	Pannaray Rasee (THA)	

===== Finals =====
Rank	Athlete	Notes
Final 1–6
1st place, gold medalist(s)	Lee Wai Sze (HKG)	
2nd place, silver medalist(s)	Deborah Herold (IND)	
3rd place, bronze medalist(s)	Ma Wing Yu (HKG)	
4	Alena Reji (IND)	
5	Fatemeh Hadavand (IRI)	
6	Ekaterina Knebeleva (UZB)	
Final 7–10
7	Ayustina Delia Priatna (INA)	
8	Crismonita Dwi Putri (INA)	
9	Pannaray Rasee (THA)	
10	Watinee Luekajorn (THA)	

==== Omnium ====
23 September

Rank	Athlete	Scratch race	Tempo race	Elim. race	Points race	Total
1st place, gold medalist(s)	Diao Xiaojuan (HKG)	40	36	40	52	168
2nd place, silver medalist(s)	Jutatip Maneephan (THA)	38	32	38	19	127
3rd place, bronze medalist(s)	Phetdarin Somrat (THA)	26	38	34	25	123
4	Olga Jantuganova (UZB)	28	26	24	34	112
5	Ayustina Delia Priatna (INA)	34	34	30	9	107
6	Parastoo Basti (IRI)	30	30	32	10	102
7	Ekaterina Knebeleva (UZB)	32	28	28	7	95
8	Li Yin Yin (HKG)	36	40	36	−17	95
—	Fatemeh Hadavand (IRI)	24	24	26	DNS	DNF

==== Team sprint ====
21 September

===== Qualifying =====
Rank	Team	Time
1	Hong Kong (HKG)	34.938
2	India (IND)	35.463
3	Thailand (THA)	36.737
4	Indonesia (INA)	37.202
5	Uzbekistan (UZB)	38.846
6	Iran (IRI)	39.783

===== 1st round =====
Rank	Team	Time
Heat 1
1	Indonesia (INA)	36.758
2	Uzbekistan (UZB)	38.568
Heat 2
1	Thailand (THA)	36.249
2	Iran (IRI)	40.043
Heat 3
1	India (IND)	35.069
Heat 4
1	Hong Kong (HKG)	34.902

===== Finals =====
Rank	Team	Time
For gold
1st place, gold medalist(s)	Hong Kong (HKG)	34.552
2nd place, silver medalist(s)	India (IND)	34.921
For bronze
3rd place, bronze medalist(s)	Thailand (THA)	36.280
4	Indonesia (INA)	36.727
