= India at the 2017 Asian Indoor and Martial Arts Games =

- IOC code: IND
- NOC: Indian Olympic Association
- Website: www.olympic.ind.in

in Ashgabat 16–27 September
- Competitors: 198 in 15 sports
- Medals Ranked 11th: Gold 9 Silver 12 Bronze 19 Total 40

Asian Indoor and Martial Arts Games appearances
- 2005; 2007; 2009; 2013; 2017; 2021; 2025

India competed at the 2017 Asian Indoor and Martial Arts Games held in Ashgabat, Turkmenistan from September 16 to 27. India sent a delegation consisting of 198 competitors for the event. India won a total of 40 medals in the event including 9 gold medals.

== Participants ==
Sport	Men	Women	Total
Belt wrestling	26	6	32
Kurash	14	13	27
Taekwondo	11	11	22
Ju Jitsu	12	8	20
Traditional Wrestling	12	5	17
Indoor Athletics	10	6	16
Wrestling	10	5	15
Chess	6	6	12
Cue Sports	6	2	8
Indoor Tennis	3	3	6
Short Course Swimming	2	4	6
Track Cycling	3	2	5
Bowling	4	0	4
Sambo	3	1	4
Dance Sport	2	2	4

== Medal table ==
Sport	Gold	Silver	Bronze	Total
Wrestling	1	2	6	9
Indoor Athletics	5	2	1	8
Indoor Tennis	2	3	0	5
Chess	0	0	5	5
Belt wrestling	0	0	4	4
Track Cycling	0	3	0	3
Kurash	0	1	2	3
Cue Sports	1	0	0	1
Short Course Swimming	0	1	0	1
Bowling	0	0	1	1

== Medallists ==
Medal	Name	Sport	Event
Gold	Bajrang Punia	Wrestling	Men's Freestyle -65 kg
Gold	Ajay Kumar Saroj	Indoor Athletics	Men's 1500m
Gold	Govindan Lakshmanan	Indoor Athletics	Men's 3000m
Gold	Arpinder Singh	Indoor Athletics	Men's Triple Jump
Gold	Chitra Palakeezh Unnikrishnan	Indoor Athletics	Women's 1500m
Gold	Purnima Hembram	Indoor Athletics	Women's Pentathlon
Gold	Vijay Sundar Prashanth & Vishnu Vardhan	Indoor Tennis	Men's Doubles
Gold	Sumit Nagal	Indoor Tennis	Men's Singles
Gold	Sourav Kothari	Cue Sports	Men's English Billiards Singles
Silver	Naveen Kumar	Wrestling	Men's Greco-Roman 130 kg
Silver	Ravinder Khatri	Wrestling	Men's Greco-Roman -85 kg
Silver	Tajinderpal Singh Toor	Indoor Athletics	Men's Shot Put
Silver	Sanjivani Jadhav	Indoor Athletics	Women's 3000m
Silver	Vijay Sundar Prashanth	Indoor Tennis	Men's Singles
Silver	Ankita Raina & Prarthana Thombare	Indoor Tennis	Women's Doubles
Silver	Vishnu Vardhan & Prarthana Thombare	Indoor Tennis	Mixed Doubles
Silver	Deborah Herold	Track Cycling	Women's Keirin
Silver	Deborah Herold	Track Cycling	Women's Sprint
Silver	Deborah Herold & Alena Reji	Track Cycling	Women's Team Sprint
Silver	Malaprabha Yallappa Jadhav	Kurash	Women's 48 kg
Silver	Sajan Prakash	Short Course Swimming	Men's 100m Butterfly
Bronze	Sandeep Tomar	Wrestling	Men's Freestyle -61 kg
Bronze	Deepak Punia	Wrestling	Men's Freestyle -86 kg
Bronze	Gurpreet Singh	Wrestling	Men's Greco-Roman -75 kg
Bronze	Sheetal Tomar	Wrestling	Women's Freestyle -48 kg
Bronze	Pooja Dhanda	Wrestling	Women's Freestyle -58 kg
Bronze	Navjot Kaur	Wrestling	Women's Freestyle -69 kg
Bronze	Neena Varakil	Indoor Athletics	Women's Long Jump
Bronze	Krishnan Sasikiran & Surya Shekhar Ganguly	Chess	Men's Blitz Team
Bronze	Diptayan Ghosh & Vaibhav Suri	Chess	Men's Blitz Team Under -23
Bronze	Karthikeyan Murali & Diptayan Ghosh	Chess	Men's Rapid Team Under -23
Bronze	Krishnan Sasikiran	Chess	Men's Standard Individual
Bronze	Padmini Rout & Tania Sachdev	Chess	Women's Rapid Team
Bronze	Dharmender Singh	Belt wrestling	Men's Freestyle -70 kg
Bronze	Keduovilie Zumu	Belt wrestling	Men's Kazakh Kurasi -90 kg
Bronze	Divya Shilwant	Belt wrestling	Women's Alysh Classic -70 kg
Bronze	Pratiksha Parhar	Belt wrestling	Women's Alysh Classic -75 kg
Bronze	Neha Solanki	Kurash	Women's +87 kg
Bronze	Jyoti	Kurash	Women's -87 kg
Bronze	Shabbir Dhankot & Dhruv Sarda	Bowling	Men's Doubles
