= Mohammad Daneshvar =

Iranian cyclist (born 1993)

Personal information
- Full name: Mohammad Daneshvar Khorram
- Born: December 18, 1993 (age 32) Mashhad, Iran
- Height: 1.81 m (5 ft 11 in)
- Weight: 84 kg (185 lb)

Sport
- Country: Iran
- Sport: Track cycling
- Coached by: mohammad aboheidari
Medal record
Representing Iran
Men's track cycling
Asian Games
Gold medal – first place	2014 Incheon	Keirin
Asian Indoor and Martial Arts Games
Gold medal – first place	2017 Ashgabat	Team sprint
Silver medal – second place	2017 Ashgabat	Sprint
Bronze medal – third place	2017 Ashgabat	Keirin
Asian Championships
Gold medal – first place	2016 Izu	1km time trial
Gold medal – first place	2017 New Delhi	1km time trial
Silver medal – second place	2017 New Delhi	Team sprint
Bronze medal – third place	2018 Nilai	1km time trial

Mohammad Daneshvar Khorram (Persian: محمد دانشور خرم, born 18 December 1993 in Mashhad) is an Iranian cyclist who won the gold medal at the 2014 Asian Games in men's Keirin.
