= Asma Rani =

Pakistani judoka

Personal information
- Nationality: Pakistani

Sport
- Sport: Judo
Medal record
Representing Pakistan
South Asian Games
Silver medal – second place	2019 Kathmandu	Mixed team

Asma Rani is a judoka from Pakistan.

== Career ==
=== National ===
Rani represents Pakistan Army in national competitions. At the National Games held in Peshawar in November 2019, she won gold in the -57 kg event.

=== International ===
In November 2018, Rani was included in the 5 member women's team and 19 member Pakistan team, sent to compete at the Commonwealth Judo Championships held in Jaipur, India. At the South Asian Games held in Kathmandu, Nepal in December 2019, she along with her teammates: Hamid Ali, Shah Hussain Shah, Qaiser Khan, Karamat Butt, Mohammad Hasnain, Nadeem Akram, Amina Toyoda, Humaira Ashiq and Beenish Khan won a silver medal in the mixed team event.

Events competed in:

1. Commonwealth Judo Championships: 2018
2. South Asian Games: 2019
