= Afghanistan at the 2017 Asian Indoor and Martial Arts Games =

- IOC code: AFG
- NOC: Afghanistan National Olympic Committee
- Website: www.olympic.af (in Persian and English)

in Ashgabat 17 to 27 September
- Competitors: 158 in 18 sports
- Flag bearer: Jawid Ahmad Amiri
- Medals Ranked 26th: Gold 1 Silver 1 Bronze 9 Total 11

Asian Indoor and Martial Arts Games appearances
- 2007; 2009; 2013; 2017; 2021; 2025

Afghanistan participated in the 2017 Asian Indoor and Martial Arts Games in Ashgabat, Turkmenistan from 17 to 27 September 2017.

== Medal winners ==
Medal	Name	Sport	Event	Date
Gold	Hussain Bakhsh Safari	Ju-jitsu	Men's Ju-Jitsu Contact -62 kg	
Silver	Jawid Ahmad Amiri	Kurash	Men's Freestyle -62 kg	
Bronze	Jawid Ahmad Ahmadi	Kurash	Men's Classic Style -90 kg	
Bronze	Sayed Gul Mehraban	Kurash	Men's Classic Style -82 kg	
Bronze	Hayatullah Khairi	Muay Thai	Men's -86 kg	
Bronze	Zohra Rezaye	Muay Thai	Women's -54 kg	
Bronze	Mirwais Omarkhil	Kurash	Men's +100 kg	
Bronze	Noor Ahmad Ahmadi	Belt wrestling	Men's Freestyle -97 kg	
Bronze	Nazir Ahmad Hossaini	Belt wrestling	Men's Freestyle -100 kg	
Bronze	Saleh Mohammad	Cue sports	Men's 6-Red Snooker Singles	
Bronze	Afghanistan Team	Cue sports	Men's Snooker Team	
