= Amina Toyoda =

Pakistani judoka (born 1999)

Personal information
- Native name: آمنہ ٹویوڈا 豊田あみな
- Nationality: Pakistani, Japanese
- Born: June 7, 1999 (age 27) Japan

Sport
- Sport: Judo
Medal record
Representing Pakistan
South Asian Games
Silver medal – second place	2019 Kathmandu	Mixed team
Bronze medal – third place	2019 Kathmandu	-57kg

Amina Toyoda (born: 7 June 1999) is a Pakistani judoka. She competes in the -57kg event.

== Family ==
Toyoda was born in Japan to a Pakistani father, Liaquat and a Japanese mother, Keiko. She speaks Japanese and a bit of English. She is a dual national of Japan and Pakistan.

== Career ==
She began her judo career at the age of five.

=== National ===
Toyodo participated for the first time at the National Championships held in Islamabad in 2019. At the National Games held in Peshawar in November 2019, competing for Pakistan Army, she won gold in the open category.

=== International ===
Toyoda competed at the Asian Junior Judo Championship held in Sochi, Russia in 2016 where she lost to Minjung Kang of Korea in the bronze match.

Senior

In April 2019, she participated in the Asia-Pacific Judo Championships held in Fujairah, UAE where she finished fifth. Later that year, she was part of the four-member team which competed at the World Judo Championships held in Japan in August 2019. She competed in the -57kg category and lost in the first round by an ippon to Germany's Pauline Starke. October 2019 saw her compete at the Abu Dhabi Grand Slam where she lost in the second round by an ippon to Germany's Theresa Stoll. In November she participated in the Osaka Grand Slam where in the second round she again lost by a ippon to US American Leilani Akiyama. In December she competed at the South Asian Games in Kathmandu, Nepal where she won a bronze medal in the -57kg event. Alongside her teammates: Hamid Ali, Shah Hussain Shah, Qaiser Khan, Karamat Butt, Mohammad Hasnain, Nadeem Akram, Beenish Khan, Humaira Ashiq and Asma Rani she also won a silver medal in the mixed team event.

In February 2020, she participated in the Paris Grand Slam 2020 where she lost in the first round to Germany's Ines Beischmidt by an ippon. At the Bratislava European Open 2020 she lost in the first round by a waza-ari to Pole, Anna Dabrowska.
