= 2020 AFC Futsal Championship =

بطولة آسيا لكرة الصالات 2020

Tournament details
- Host country: Turkmenistan (original host); Kuwait (new host)
- Dates: Cancelled
- Teams: 16 (from 1 confederation)
- Venues: 2 (in 1 host city)

The 2020 AFC Futsal Championship would have been the 16th edition of the AFC Futsal Championship, the biennial international futsal championship organised by the Asian Football Confederation (AFC) for the men's national teams of Asia. A total of 16 teams would have taken part in the tournament.

The tournament was originally scheduled to be played in Turkmenistan between 26 February and 8 March 2020. However, the AFC announced on 3 February 2020 that due to the COVID-19 pandemic, the tournament had been postponed following consultation with all relevant stakeholders. On 9 March 2020, FIFA and AFC announced that the tournament were postponed to 5–16 August 2020, but in July 2020, the tournament schedule was moved again to 4–15 November 2020. On 10 September 2020, the AFC announced that the tournament would instead be held in Kuwait between 2–13 December 2020. On 15 October 2020, the AFC announced that due to spike of COVID-19 cases in Kuwait, the tournament was further postponed to 2021. On 10 November 2020, the AFC approved the new dates as between 23 March and 3 April 2021. However, AFC announced the cancellation of the tournament on 25 January 2021, leaving the hosting rights for the 2022 AFC Futsal Asian Cup with Kuwait.

Same as previous editions held on the same year as the FIFA Futsal World Cup, the tournament would have acted as the AFC qualifiers for the World Cup. The top five teams of the tournament would have qualified for the 2021 FIFA Futsal World Cup (originally 2020 but postponed due to COVID-19 pandemic) in Lithuania as the AFC representatives. On 21 April 2021, the AFC announced that Iran, Japan, and Uzbekistan were nominated as the AFC representatives, while the remaining two teams to be determined by play-off matches between Iraq (although Iraq had not qualified for the 2020 AFC Futsal Championship), Lebanon, Thailand, and Vietnam.

Iran were the defending champions.

== Host selection ==
The following nations expressed interest to host the tournament:

- Kuwait (Kuwait City)
- Jordan (Amman)
- Japan (Nagoya)
- Turkmenistan (Ashgabat)
- Indonesia (Jakarta)

In spring 2019, Turkmenistan was chosen as the host to take place in Ashgabat, before being moved to Kuwait.

== Qualification ==
Qualifying was played from 16 – 27 October 2019. Turkmenistan also participated in the qualifiers, even though they had already qualified automatically as hosts. Kuwait had to play the qualifying round (in case of a non-qualification, another host would have been chosen).

=== Qualified teams ===
The following 16 teams qualified for the final tournament.

Team	Qualified as	Appearance (planned)	Previous best performance
Turkmenistan	Original hosts	7th	Group stage (2005, 2006, 2007, 2008, 2010, 2012)
Thailand	ASEAN Zone winners	16th	Runners-up (2008, 2012)
Indonesia	ASEAN Zone runners-up	10th	Group stage (2002, 2003, 2004, 2005, 2006, 2008, 2010, 2012, 2014)
Vietnam	ASEAN Zone third place	6th	Fourth place (2016)
Uzbekistan	Central & South Zone Group A winners	16th	Runners-up (2001, 2006, 2010, 2016)
Tajikistan	Central & South Zone Group A runners-up	11th	Quarter-finals (2007)
Iran	Central & South Zone Group B winners	16th	Champions (1999, 2000, 2001, 2002, 2003, 2004, 2005, 2007, 2008, 2010, 2016, 2018)
Kyrgyzstan	Central & South Zone Group B runners-up	16th	Semi-finals (2005), Fourth place (2006, 2007)
China	East Zone Group A winners	13th	Fourth place (2008, 2010)
Japan	East Zone Group B winners	16th	Champions (2006, 2012, 2014)
South Korea	East Zone Play-off winners	14th	Runners-up (1999)
Kuwait	West Zone Group A winners	12th	Fourth place (2003, 2014)
Bahrain	West Zone Group A runners-up	3rd	Quarter-finals (2018)
Lebanon	West Zone Group B winners	12th	Quarter-finals (2004, 2007, 2008, 2010, 2012, 2014, 2018)
Saudi Arabia	West Zone Group B runners-up	2nd	Group stage (2016)
Oman	West Zone Play-off winners	1st	Debut

== Venues ==
The competition was originally to be played at the Main Indoor Arena and the Martial Arts Arena in Ashgabat, before being moved to Kuwait.

Original host

Ashgabat
Main Indoor Arena	Martial Arts Arena
Capacity: 15,000	Capacity: Unknown

New host

Kuwait City
Saad Al Abdullah Hall
Capacity: 6,000

== Squads ==
Each team had to submit a squad of 14 players, including a minimum of two goalkeepers.

== Draw ==
The final draw was held on 6 December 2019, 15:00 TMT (UTC+5), at the Olympia Hotel in Ashgabat. The 16 teams were drawn into four groups of four teams. The teams were seeded according to their performance in the 2018 AFC Futsal Championship final tournament and qualification, with the original hosts Turkmenistan automatically seeded and assigned to Position A1 in the draw.

Pot 1	Pot 2	Pot 3	Pot 4
1. Turkmenistan (original hosts); 2. Iran; 3. Japan; 4. Uzbekistan	5. Lebanon; 6. Vietnam; 7. Bahrain; 8. Thailand	9. Kyrgyzstan; 10. Tajikistan; 11. China; 12. South Korea	13. Saudi Arabia; 14. Indonesia; 15. Kuwait (unranked; new hosts); 16. Oman (unranked)

== Group stage ==
The top two teams of each group would have advanced to the quarter-finals.

Tiebreakers

The teams were ranked according to points (3 points for a win, 1 point for a draw, 0 points for a loss). If tied on points, tiebreakers would be applied in the following order:

1. Greater number of points obtained in the group matches between the teams concerned;
2. Goal difference resulting from the group matches between the teams concerned;
3. Greater number of goals scored in the group matches between the teams concerned;
4. If, after applying criteria 1 to 3, teams still have an equal ranking, criteria 1 to 3 are reapplied exclusively to the matches between the teams in question to determine their final rankings. If this procedure does not lead to a decision, criteria 5 to 9 apply;
5. Goal difference in all the group matches;
6. Greater number of goals scored in all the group matches;
7. Penalty shoot-out if only two teams are involved and they are both on the field of play;
8. Fewer score calculated according to the number of yellow and red cards received in the group matches (1 point for a single yellow card, 3 points for a red card as a consequence of two yellow cards, 3 points for a direct red card, 4 points for a yellow card followed by a direct red card);
9. Drawing of lots.

All times are local, AST (UTC+3).

Schedule
Matchday	Matches
Matchday 1	1 v 4, 2 v 3
Matchday 2	4 v 2, 3 v 1
Matchday 3	1 v 2, 3 v 4

=== Group A ===
Pos	Team	Pld	W	D	L	GF	GA	GD	Pts	Qualification
1	Turkmenistan	0	0	0	0	0	0	0	0	Knockout stage
2	Vietnam	0	0	0	0	0	0	0	0	Knockout stage
3	Tajikistan	0	0	0	0	0	0	0	0	
4	Oman	0	0	0	0	0	0	0	0	

Source: AFC
Rules for classification: Group stage tiebreakers

Vietnam	Cancelled	Tajikistan
	Report

Turkmenistan	Cancelled	Oman
	Report

Oman	Cancelled	Vietnam
	Report

Tajikistan	Cancelled	Turkmenistan
	Report

Tajikistan	Cancelled	Oman
	Report

Turkmenistan	Cancelled	Vietnam
	Report

=== Group B ===
Pos	Team	Pld	W	D	L	GF	GA	GD	Pts	Qualification
1	Japan	0	0	0	0	0	0	0	0	Knockout stage
2	Lebanon	0	0	0	0	0	0	0	0	Knockout stage
3	Kyrgyzstan	0	0	0	0	0	0	0	0	
4	Kuwait (H)	0	0	0	0	0	0	0	0	

Source: AFC
Rules for classification: Group stage tiebreakers
(H) Hosts

Lebanon	Cancelled	Kyrgyzstan
	Report

Japan	Cancelled	Kuwait
	Report

Kuwait	Cancelled	Lebanon
	Report

Kyrgyzstan	Cancelled	Japan
	Report

Japan	Cancelled	Lebanon
	Report

Kyrgyzstan	Cancelled	Kuwait
	Report

=== Group C ===
Pos	Team	Pld	W	D	L	GF	GA	GD	Pts	Qualification
1	Uzbekistan	0	0	0	0	0	0	0	0	Knockout stage
2	Bahrain	0	0	0	0	0	0	0	0	Knockout stage
3	China	0	0	0	0	0	0	0	0	
4	Indonesia	0	0	0	0	0	0	0	0	

Source: AFC
Rules for classification: Group stage tiebreakers

Bahrain	Cancelled	China
	Report

Uzbekistan	Cancelled	Indonesia
	Report

Indonesia	Cancelled	Bahrain
	Report

China	Cancelled	Uzbekistan
	Report

Uzbekistan	Cancelled	Bahrain
	Report

China	Cancelled	Indonesia
	Report

=== Group D ===
Pos	Team	Pld	W	D	L	GF	GA	GD	Pts	Qualification
1	Iran	0	0	0	0	0	0	0	0	Knockout stage
2	Thailand	0	0	0	0	0	0	0	0	Knockout stage
3	South Korea	0	0	0	0	0	0	0	0	
4	Saudi Arabia	0	0	0	0	0	0	0	0	

Source: AFC
Rules for classification: Group stage tiebreakers

Thailand	Cancelled	South Korea
	Report

Iran	Cancelled	Saudi Arabia
	Report

Saudi Arabia	Cancelled	Thailand
	Report

South Korea	Cancelled	Iran
	Report

Iran	Cancelled	Thailand
	Report

South Korea	Cancelled	Saudi Arabia
	Report

== Knockout stage ==
In the knockout stage, extra time and penalty shoot-out would be used to decide the winner if necessary (no extra time would be used in the third place match).

=== Bracket ===
Quarter-finals
–
Winner Group A
Runner-up Group B
–
Winner Group C
Runner-up Group D
–
Winner Group B
Runner-up Group A
–
Winner Group D
Runner-up Group C

Semi-finals
–
Winner QF1
Winner QF2
–
Winner QF3
Winner QF4

Final
–
Winner SF1
Winner SF2
Third place match
–
Loser SF1
Loser SF2

Fifth place play-offs
–
Loser QF1
Loser QF2
–
Loser QF3
Loser QF4

Fifth place match
–
Winner PO1
Winner PO2

=== Quarter-finals ===
Winners would have qualified for 2021 FIFA Futsal World Cup. Losers would have entered fifth place play-offs.

Winner Group C	Cancelled	Runner-up Group D
	Report

Winner Group D	Cancelled	Runner-up Group C
	Report

Winner Group B	Cancelled	Runner-up Group A
	Report

Winner Group A	Cancelled	Runner-up Group B
	Report

=== Fifth place play-offs ===
Loser QF3	Cancelled	Loser QF4
	Report

Loser QF1	Cancelled	Loser QF2
	Report

=== Semi-finals ===
Winner QF3	Cancelled	Winner QF4
	Report

Winner QF1	Cancelled	Winner QF2
	Report

=== Fifth place match ===
Winner would have qualified for 2021 FIFA Futsal World Cup.

Winner PO1	Cancelled	Winner PO2
	Report

=== Third place match ===
Loser SF1	Cancelled	Loser SF2
	Report

=== Final ===
Winner SF1	Cancelled	Winner SF2
	Report

== See also ==
- 2021 FIFA Futsal World Cup qualification (AFC)
