= Humaira Ashiq =

Pakistani judoka

Personal information
- Nationality: Pakistani
- Born: July 28, 1989 (age 37)

Sport
- Sport: Judo
Medal record
Representing Pakistan
South Asian Games
Silver medal – second place	2016 Guwahati	-48kg
Silver medal – second place	2019 Kathmandu	Mixed team
Bronze medal – third place	2010 Dhaka	-52kg
Bronze medal – third place	2019 Kathmandu	-48kg

Humaira Ashiq (born 28 July 1989) is a Pakistani judoka.

== Career ==
=== National ===
In national level competitions, Ashiq represents, WAPDA. At the National Games held in Peshawar in November 2019, Ashiq won gold in her weight category (-48kg).

=== International ===
In 2009, Ashiq participated in the 1st Asian Martial Arts Games held in Bangkok, Thailand.

In 2010, at the 11th South Asian Games held in Dhaka, Bangladesh, Ashiq won a bronze medal in the -52kg event. At the Asian Judo Championships held in Guangzhou, China the same year, Ashiq competed in the -48kg event. She lost to Kazakhstan's Alexandra Podryadova by an ippon.

In 2012, at the Asian Judo Championships held in Tashkent, Uzbekistan, Ashiq competed in the -52kg event. She lost to Kazakhstan's Kelbet Nurgazina by an ippon. At the South Asian Judo Championships held in Kathmandu, Nepal in 2014, Ashiq won a gold medal. At the 2015 Asian Judo Championships held in Kuwait City, Kuwait, Ashiq competed in the -48kg event. In the first round, she lost to Kazakhstan's Alexandra Podryadova by waza-ari.

At the 12th South Asian Games held in Guwahati, India in 2016, Ashiq wona silver in the -48kg category. At the Asian Indoor and Martial Arts Games held in Turkmenistan in 2017, Ashiq competed in belt wrestling winning a bronze medal in the 50kg classic style. 2018 saw her win a silver medal at the 8th South Asian Judo Championship held in Nepal after losing to her Indian opponent in the final.

At the World Championships held in Tokyo, Japan in 2019, Ashiq lost by an ippon to the world no 49, Mary Dee Vargas Ley of Chile in the first round. In December she competed at the South Asian Games in Kathmandu, Nepal where she won a bronze medal in the -48kg event. Alongside her teammates: Hamid Ali, Shah Hussain Shah, Qaiser Khan, Karamat Butt, Mohammad Hasnain, Nadeem Akram, Beenish Khan, Amina Toyoda and Asma Rani she also won a silver medal in the mixed team event.

==== Competitions ====
She has participated in the following international events:

1. 2009: First Asian Martial Arts Games, Bangkok, Thailand
2. April 2010: Asian Championships, Guangzhou, China
3. 2010: South Asian Games, Dhaka, Bangladesh
4. April 2012: Asian Championships Seniors
5. May 2015: Asian Championships Seniors
6. 2016: South Asian Games, Guwahati, India
7. August 2019: World Championships Seniors, Tokyo, Japan
8. 2019: South Asian Games, Kathmandu, Nepal
