= Deborah Herold =

Indian cyclist

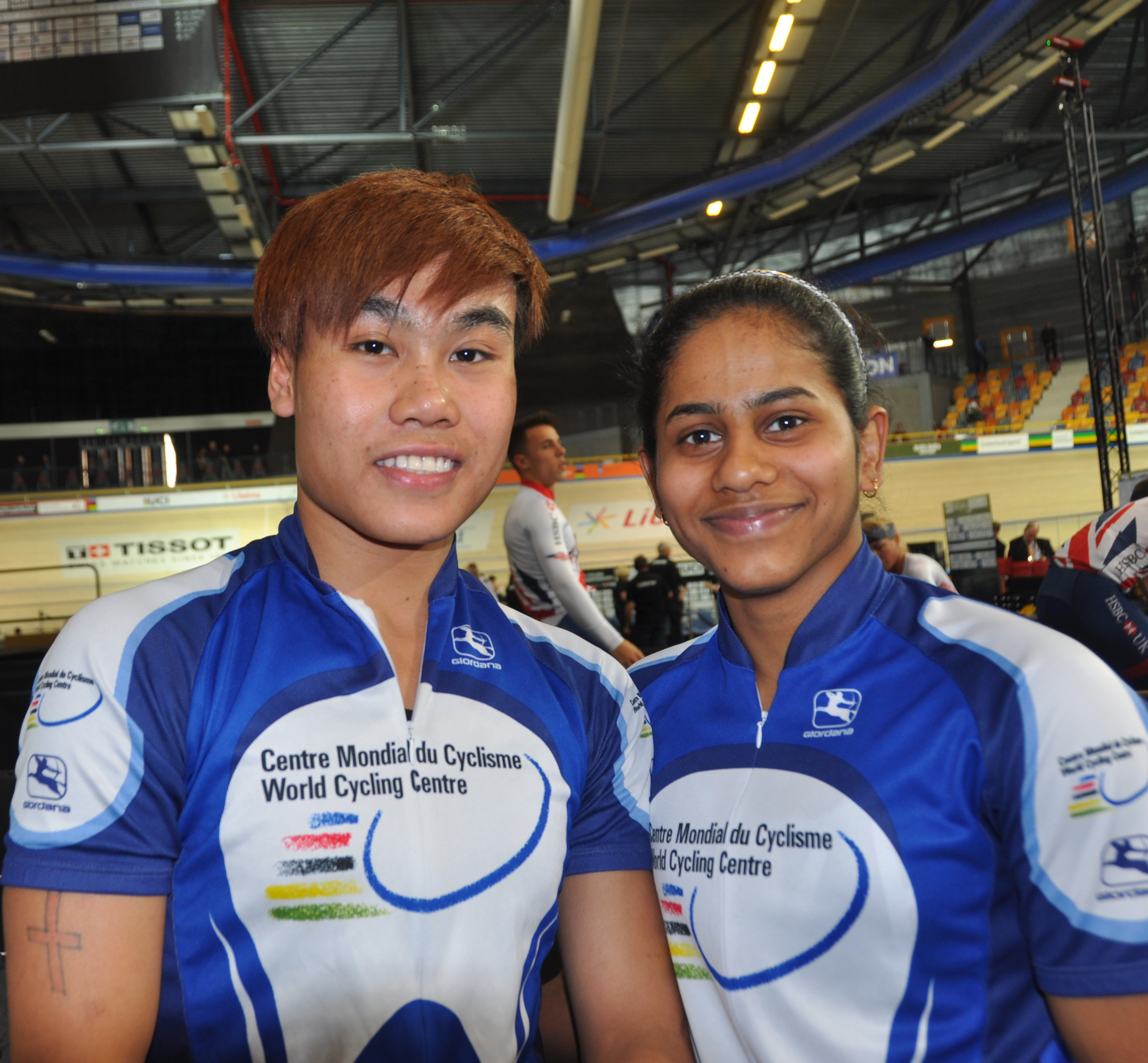
- Deborah and her team sprint partner Alena Reji (2018)
- Born: 18 February 1995 (age 31); Car Nicobar, Andaman and Nicobar Islands, India
- Occupation: Cyclist
- Years active: 2011–present

Deborah Herold a.k.a. Deborah Deborah (born 18 February 1995 in Car Nicobar, Andaman and Nicobar Islands) is an Indian cyclist.

== Early life and education ==
Herold is an ethnic Nicobarese. She grew up in Car Nicobar, where her father served as an Air Force officer. She was at her village in Car Nicobar island when the 2004 tsunami hit and spent around a week stuck in a tree surviving on leaves and tree bark. She received support from the Sports Authority of India (SAI) Centre supports in Andaman. Since 2011, she lives in New Delhi, and trains at the Velodrome in the Indira Gandhi Sports Complex.

== Career ==
In 2014, Herold won two gold medals at the Asia Cup in the 500-meter time trial and the team sprint. In October 2015, she won five medals at the Taiwan Cup Track International Classic, then three medals at the Track India Cup. She is the first Indian cyclist in the UCI rankings of a discipline – the 500m time trial – and is ranked fourth. She has won three silver medal at 2017 Asian Indoor and Martial Arts Games.
