= Beenish Khan =

Pakistani judoka

Personal information
- Nationality: Pakistani

Sport
- Sport: Judo
Medal record
Representing Pakistan
South Asian Games
Silver medal – second place	2016 Guwahati	-70kg
Silver medal – second place	2019 Kathmandu	Mixed team
Bronze medal – third place	2019 Kathmandu	+78kg

Beenish Khan is a judoka from Pakistan.

== Career ==
=== International ===
In 2009, she was part of the team sent to the first Asian Martial Arts Games held in Bangkok, Thailand. At the South Asian Games held in Guwahati, India, Khan won a silver medal in the -70 kg event. At the South Asian Games held in Kathmandu, Nepal in December 2019, she won a bronze medal in the 78+kg event. Alongside her teammates: Hamid Ali, Shah Hussain Shah, Qaiser Khan, Karamat Butt, Mohammad Hasnain, Nadeem Akram, Amina Toyoda, Humaira Ashiq and Asma Rani she also won a silver medal in the mixed team event.

Events participated in

1. Commonwealth Judo Championships: 2018
2. South Asian Games: 2016, 2019
