= Alena Reji =

Indian cyclist (born 1999)

Aleena Reji
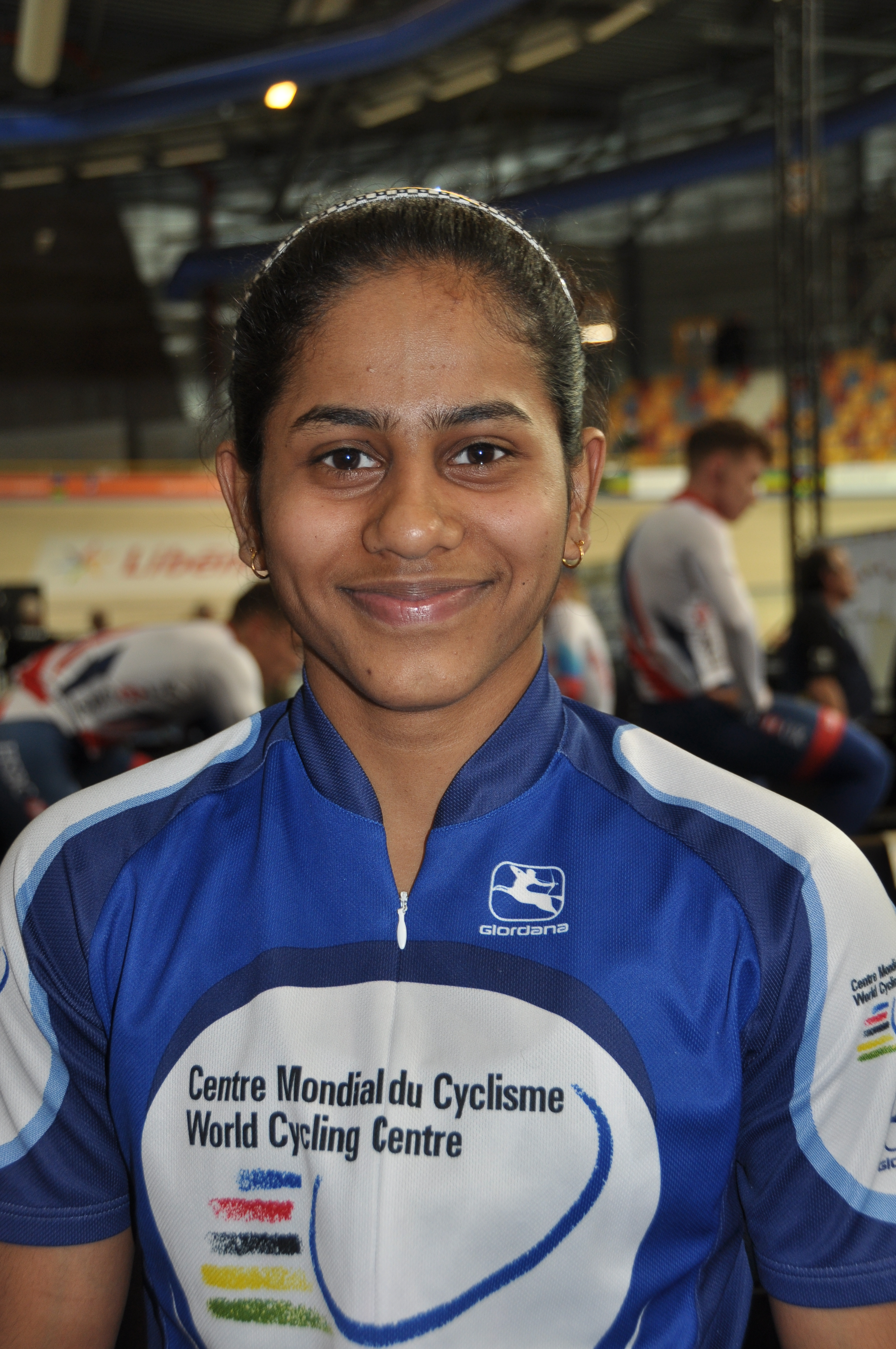
- Aleena Reji (February 2018)

Personal information
- Born: 9 May 1999 (age 27) Thiruvambady, Kerala
- Height: 160 cm (5 ft 3 in)
- Weight: 53 kg (117 lb)

Cycling career
- Sport: Cycling
- Discipline: Track
- Role: Rider

Aleena Reji (born 9 May 1999) is an Indian cyclist who specializes in track cycling. She comes from Thiruvambady, Kerala.

== Early life ==
Reji is the daughter of Reji Cherian and was gifted a cycle to save time while going to school.

== Career ==
At the age of 12, Reji was selected by the Kerala State Sports Council (KSSC) and moved to Thiruvananthapuram. Chandran Chettiar from KSSC is her coach.

In the 37th Asia Track cycling championship 2017, Reji bagged a bronze medal in the 500m time trial in the junior women category. This medal was the second for India in the sport.

In the Track Asia Cup 2016, Reji won a silver beating Jantuganova Olga from Uzbekistan.

Reji was also selected to participate in the 38th Senior Asian Track Championship held in Malaysia in 2018. She clocked 34.845 seconds and finished 6th failing to qualify. The best 4 made it the next round.

She was nominated for the 2018 UCI Track Cycling World Championships in Apeldoorn, where she went with Deborah Herold in the team sprint at the start. The duo finished last.
