= Ashgabat Main Indoor Arena =

Sports venue in Ashgabat, Turkmenistan

Complex of game sports
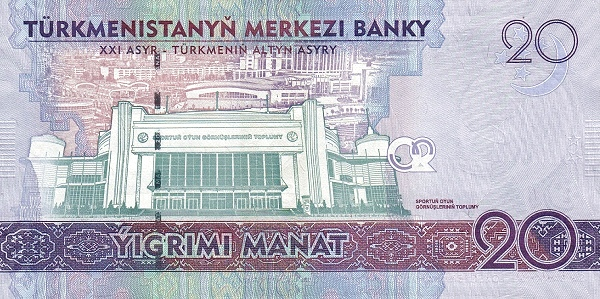
- Interactive map of Complex of game sports
- Location: Olympic Complex, Ashgabat, Turkmenistan
- Coordinates: 37.8972°N 58.3753°E
- Operator: Government of Turkmenistan
- Capacity: 15,000

Construction
- Built: 2015
- Opened: 2016
- Architect: Polimeks

The Complex of game sports (Turkmen: Sportuň oýun görnüşleriniň toplumy) is an indoor arena located in Olympic Complex, Ashgabat, Turkmenistan. It is owned and operated by Government of Turkmenistan for 2017 Asian Indoor and Martial Arts Games. It has a seating capacity of 15,000 for concerts, for the sports like basketball, volleyball, handball, badminton, modern rhythmic gymnastics and artistic gymnastics, fencing, table tennis, trampoline tumbling, judo and wrestling.

== Structure of the building ==
The building has a universal arena 70m х 40 m.

== Sporting Events ==
- 2017 Asian Indoor and Martial Arts Games
- 2020 AFC Futsal Championship
