= Qaiser Khan =

Indian politician

Qaiser Ali Khan
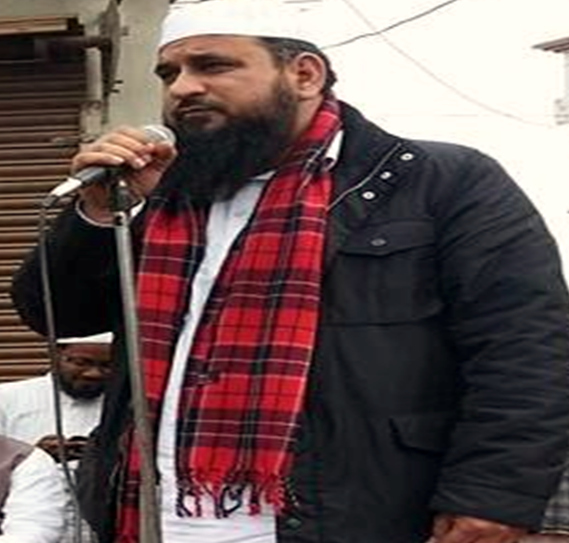
- Qaiser Ali Khan at Kishanganj Constituency during 2014 Lok Sabha Election

general secretary Bihar Pradesh Congress Committee

Personal details
- Born: 16 December 1971 (age 54) Varisnagar, Samastipur, India
- Party: Indian National Congress
- Spouse: Nilofar Ali
- Children: 3
- Education: Victoria Memorial English School; Zakir Hussein College; Delhi University
- Profession: Businessman politician

Qaiser Ali Khan (born 16 December 1971) is an Indian politician affiliated with the Indian National Congress party. He also serves as general secretary of the Bihar Pradesh Congress Committee.

== Early life and education ==
Qaiser Ali Khan was born in Varisnagar, Samastipur, Bihar to Wajiha Khanam and Shaukat Ali Khan.

He did his schooling from Victoria Memorial English School, Patna and his graduation from Zakir Hussein College, Delhi University. In 2009, Khan established Y K Homes, a real estate firm.
