= Muaythai at the Asian Indoor and Martial Arts Games =

- Governing body: IFMA
- Events: 21 (men: 12; women: 9)

Games
- 2005; 2007; 2009 (M); 2009; 2013; 2017; 2021

Muaythai (Note: Muaythai is the official name of Muay Thai, recognized by Olympic Council of Asia and International Olympic Committee.) (known as Muay (Note: Muay is the alternative name of muaythai, by deleting the world of "thai", for avoiding the dispute of Mainland Southeast Asia martial arts between Southeast Asian nations.) until 2017) was featured in the Asian Indoor and Martial Arts Games official programme for the first time at the 2005 Asian Indoor Games in Bangkok, Thailand. It has been played at all editions since then.

The International Federation of Muaythai Associations is governing body for muaythai at the Asian Indoor and Martial Arts Games.

== Summary ==
Games	Year	Events	Best Nation
1	2005	17	Thailand
2	2007	9	Thailand
M	2009	15	Thailand
3	2009	9	Thailand
4	2013	9	Thailand
5	2017	14	Thailand

== Events ==
=== Fighting ===
The muaythai fighting competition is organized as a set of tournaments, one for each weight class. The number of weight classes has changed over the years (currently 10 for men and 7 for women), and the definition of each class has changed several times, as shown in the following table. Weights were measured in kilograms.

Men's weight classes
2017	2021
Cruiserweight (81–86 kg)	
Light heavyweight (75–81 kg)
Middleweight (71–75 kg)
Light middleweight (67–71 kg)
Welterweight (63.5–67 kg)
Light welterweight (60–63.5 kg)
Lightweight (57–60 kg)
Featherweight (54–57 kg)
Bantamweight (51–54 kg)
	Flyweight (48–51 kg)
	Light flyweight (–48 kg)

=== Waikru ===
The muaythai waikru competition will be featured for the first time at the 2021 Asian Indoor and Martial Arts Games in Bangkok, Thailand.
