= Karate at the 2009 Asian Martial Arts Games =

Karate competition

- Venue: Indoor Stadium Huamark
- Dates: 6–8 August 2009

The Karate competition at the 2009 Asian Martial Arts Games took place from 6 August to 8 August 2009 at the Indoor Stadium Huamark. Kumite contested in six weight classes for men and four for women.

== Medalists ==
=== Men ===
Event	Gold	Silver	Bronze
−55 kg	Hsieh Cheng-kang; Chinese Taipei	Nguyễn Mạnh Tuấn; Vietnam	Laxman Singh; India
−55 kg	Hsieh Cheng-kang; Chinese Taipei	Nguyễn Mạnh Tuấn; Vietnam	Hirannithishatphol Saratham; Thailand
−60 kg	Masahiko Ota; Japan	Lee Ji-hwan; South Korea	Darkhan Assadilov; Kazakhstan
−60 kg	Masahiko Ota; Japan	Lee Ji-hwan; South Korea	Mohammad Hashim; Kuwait
−67 kg	Shinji Nagaki; Japan	Nguyễn Ngọc Thành; Vietnam	Sayed Mohammad Amiri; Afghanistan
−67 kg	Shinji Nagaki; Japan	Nguyễn Ngọc Thành; Vietnam	Pang Iat Long; Macau
−75 kg	Naowras Al-Hamwi; Syria	Ahmad Al-Mesfer; Kuwait	Kenta Kai; Japan
−75 kg	Naowras Al-Hamwi; Syria	Ahmad Al-Mesfer; Kuwait	Yuttana Klamprabud; Thailand
−84 kg	Ryosuke Shimizu; Japan	Hendro Salim; Indonesia	Hatta Mahamut; Malaysia
−84 kg	Ryosuke Shimizu; Japan	Hendro Salim; Indonesia	Ahmad Al-Dousari; Kuwait
+84 kg	Khalid Khalidov; Kazakhstan	Li Peng; China	Rustam Ashurov; Uzbekistan
+84 kg	Khalid Khalidov; Kazakhstan	Li Peng; China	Amer Abu Afifeh; Jordan

=== Women ===
Event	Gold	Silver	Bronze
−50 kg	Kou Man I Macau	Chen Yen-hui; Chinese Taipei	Đào Thị Thoan; Vietnam
−50 kg	Kou Man I Macau	Chen Yen-hui; Chinese Taipei	Li Hong; China
−55 kg	Chen Dan; China	Miki Kobayashi; Japan	Lưu Thị Thúy Hoa; Vietnam
−55 kg	Chen Dan; China	Miki Kobayashi; Japan	Venera Zhetibay; Kazakhstan
−61 kg	Sayuri Maejima; Japan	Chan Ka Man; Hong Kong	Manar Shath; Jordan
−61 kg	Sayuri Maejima; Japan	Chan Ka Man; Hong Kong	Bùi Thị Triều; Vietnam
+61 kg	Jamaliah Jamaludin; Malaysia	Paula Carion; Macau	Sofiya Kaspulatova; Uzbekistan
+61 kg	Jamaliah Jamaludin; Malaysia	Paula Carion; Macau	Buthaina Al-Mahsiri; Jordan

== Medal table ==
Rank	Nation	Gold	Silver	Bronze	Total
1	Japan (JPN)	4	1	1	6
2	China (CHN)	1	1	1	3
2	Macau (MAC)	1	1	1	3
4	Chinese Taipei (TPE)	1	1	0	2
5	Kazakhstan (KAZ)	1	0	2	3
6	Malaysia (MAS)	1	0	1	2
7	Syria (SYR)	1	0	0	1
8	Vietnam (VIE)	0	2	3	5
9	Kuwait (KUW)	0	1	2	3
10	Hong Kong (HKG)	0	1	0	1
10	Indonesia (INA)	0	1	0	1
10	South Korea (KOR)	0	1	0	1
13	Jordan (JOR)	0	0	3	3
14	Thailand (THA)	0	0	2	2
14	Uzbekistan (UZB)	0	0	2	2
16	Afghanistan (AFG)	0	0	1	1
16	India (IND)	0	0	1	1
Totals (17 entries)		10	10	20	40

== Results ==
=== Men ===
==== 55 kg ====
6 August

Preliminary 1/8
Hj Eddie Jofriani Hj Johari (BRU)	1
Nguyễn Mạnh Tuấn (VIE)	3

Quarterfinals
Ruwan Niroshan (SRI)	1
Laxman Singh (IND)	3
Hsieh Cheng-kang (TPE)	5
Inthanousone Vilaysouk (LAO)	1
Faruq Omar (BAN)	0
Nguyễn Mạnh Tuấn (VIE)	2
Hirannithishatphol Saratham (THA)	9
Milan Nepali (NEP)	1

Semifinals
Laxman Singh (IND)	0
Hsieh Cheng-kang (TPE)	3
Nguyễn Mạnh Tuấn (VIE)	3
Hirannithishatphol Saratham (THA)	2

Final
Hsieh Cheng-kang (TPE)	2
Nguyễn Mạnh Tuấn (VIE)	1

Repechage 1
Faruq Omar (BAN)	0
Hj Eddie Jofriani Hj Johari (BRU)	3

Repechage final
Inthanousone Vilaysouk (LAO)	3
Laxman Singh (IND)	6
Hirannithishatphol Saratham (THA)	6
Hj Eddie Jofriani Hj Johari (BRU)	3

==== 60 kg ====
6 August

Preliminary 1/16
Ali Emam Gazi (BAN)	DQ	Lee Ji-hwan (KOR)
Ram Bahadur Limbu (NEP)	1–5	Donny Dharmawan (INA)
Saadi Abbas Jalbani (PAK)	4–6	Masahiko Ota (JPN)

Preliminary 1/8
Darkhan Assadilov (KAZ)	4
Ali Fayadh (IRQ)	0
Cheung Kwan Lok (HKG)	4
Baseer Ahmad Salehi (AFG)	1
Mohd Fida'iy Hj Sanif (BRU)	2
Lee Ji-hwan (KOR)	9
Nguyễn Hoàng Hiệp (VIE)	6
Yutthana Sripraphan (THA)	3
Mohammad Hashim (KUW)	3
Irineo Toribio (PHI)	1
Donny Dharmawan (INA)	3
Saidlaziz Burkhonov (UZB)	1
Puvaneswaran Ramasamy (MAS)	2
Masahiko Ota (JPN)	3
Ranuka Sanjeewa (SRI)	1
Xaysavath Xayakone (LAO)	7

Quarterfinals
Darkhan Assadilov (KAZ)	7
Cheung Kwan Lok (HKG)	0
Lee Ji-hwan (KOR)	5
Nguyễn Hoàng Hiệp (VIE)	3
Mohammad Hashim (KUW)	2
Donny Dharmawan (INA)	1
Masahiko Ota (JPN)	8
Xaysavath Xayakone (LAO)	1

Semifinals
Darkhan Assadilov (KAZ)	3
Lee Ji-hwan (KOR)	6
Mohammad Hashim (KUW)	2
Masahiko Ota (JPN)	5

Final
Lee Ji-hwan (KOR)	2
Masahiko Ota (JPN)	4

Repechage 1
Ali Emam Gazi (BAN)
Mohd Fida'iy Hj Sanif (BRU)	DQ
Puvaneswaran Ramasamy (MAS)	2
Saadi Abbas Jalbani (PAK)	3

Repechage 2
Mohd Fida'iy Hj Sanif (BRU)	4
Nguyễn Hoàng Hiệp (VIE)	6
Xaysavath Xayakone (LAO)	3
Saadi Abbas Jalbani (PAK)	1

Repechage final
Nguyễn Hoàng Hiệp (VIE)	2
Darkhan Assadilov (KAZ)	4
Mohammad Hashim (KUW)	2
Xaysavath Xayakone (LAO)	0

==== 67 kg ====
7 August

Preliminary 1/16
Mohd Fadillah Hj Sanif (BRU)	DQ	Choton Chakma (BAN)
Huang Hsiang-chen (TPE)	5–6	Pang Iat Long (MAC)
Woraphol Kueapol (THA)	10–7	Shaharudin Jamaludin (MAS)
Nguyễn Ngọc Thành (VIE)	8–0	Ismail Aswar (INA)
Mukundra Maharjan (NEP)	0–6	Sayed Mohammad Amiri (AFG)
Karem Othman (SYR)	5–2	Yuen Siu Lun (HKG)
Paritosh Sharma (IND)	0–5	Li Haojie (CHN)
Qassim Ghavidel (QAT)	1–7	Rinat Sagandykov (KAZ)

Preliminary 1/8
Saythansavanh Inkhathed (LAO)	0
Mohd Fadillah Hj Sanif (BRU)	6
Pang Iat Long (MAC)	3
Son Se-ho (KOR)	0
Rayappan Jebamalai Edward (SRI)	0
Woraphol Kueapol (THA)	4
Nguyễn Ngọc Thành (VIE)	1
Muhammad Ramzan (PAK)	0
Yasir Issam (IRQ)	0
Sayed Mohammad Amiri (AFG)	8
Karem Othman (SYR)	0
Shinji Nagaki (JPN)	1
Rolando Lagman (PHI)	1
Li Haojie (CHN)	9
Rinat Sagandykov (KAZ)	1
Mohammad Hadid (JOR)	3

Quarterfinals
Mohd Fadillah Hj Sanif (BRU)	0
Pang Iat Long (MAC)	1
Woraphol Kueapol (THA)	0
Nguyễn Ngọc Thành (VIE)	8
Sayed Mohammad Amiri (AFG)	0
Shinji Nagaki (JPN)	3
Li Haojie (CHN)	8
Mohammad Hadid (JOR)	10

Semifinals
Pang Iat Long (MAC)	2
Nguyễn Ngọc Thành (VIE)	3
Shinji Nagaki (JPN)	3
Mohammad Hadid (JOR)	1

Final
Nguyễn Ngọc Thành (VIE)	1
Shinji Nagaki (JPN)	9

Repechage 1
Ismail Aswar (INA)	2
Muhammad Ramzan (PAK)	3

Repechage 2
Muhammad Ramzan (PAK)	DQ
Woraphol Kueapol (THA)
Sayed Mohammad Amiri (AFG)	7
Karem Othman (SYR)	4

Repechage final
Muhammad Ramzan (PAK)	2
Pang Iat Long (MAC)	4
Mohammad Hadid (JOR)	1
Sayed Mohammad Amiri (AFG)	8

==== 75 kg ====
7 August

Preliminary 1/16
Xu Xiangwu (CHN)	4–2	Ashok Darda (IND)
Asem Abujamous (JOR)	0–7	Ahmad Al-Mesfer (KUW)
Soukphansa Inthavongsa (LAO)	0–4	Nguyễn Minh Phụng (VIE)
Bassam Eid (BRN)	1–2	Yen Tzu-yao (TPE)

Preliminary 1/8
Repael Meirizky (INA)	0
Yuttana Klamprabud (THA)	1
Xu Xiangwu (CHN)	1
Kwon Dong-jik (KOR)	3
Sasanka Shrestha (NEP)
Ahmad Al-Mesfer (KUW)	DQ
Lee Ka Wai (HKG)	8
Nagatheeban Govindasamy (MAS)	0
Wong Wai Kam (MAC)	1
Murod Mustafaev (UZB)	0
Nguyễn Minh Phụng (VIE)	4
Kenta Kai (JPN)	9
Anura Tissa Kumara (SRI)	0
Yen Tzu-yao (TPE)	8
Naowras Al-Hamwi (SYR)	4
Shaukat Ali (PAK)	0

Quarterfinals
Yuttana Klamprabud (THA)	9
Kwon Dong-jik (KOR)	1
Ahmad Al-Mesfer (KUW)	5
Lee Ka Wai (HKG)	2
Wong Wai Kam (MAC)	4
Kenta Kai (JPN)	8
Yen Tzu-yao (TPE)	3
Naowras Al-Hamwi (SYR)	4

Semifinals
Yuttana Klamprabud (THA)	2
Ahmad Al-Mesfer (KUW)	10
Kenta Kai (JPN)	4
Naowras Al-Hamwi (SYR)	6

Final
Ahmad Al-Mesfer (KUW)	1
Naowras Al-Hamwi (SYR)	4

Repechage 1
Asem Abujamous (JOR)	DQ
Sasanka Shrestha (NEP)

Repechage 2
Asem Abujamous (JOR)	3
Lee Ka Wai (HKG)	1
Yen Tzu-yao (TPE)	3
Shaukat Ali (PAK)	1

Repechage final
Asem Abujamous (JOR)	1
Yuttana Klamprabud (THA)	3
Kenta Kai (JPN)	15
Yen Tzu-yao (TPE)	7

==== 84 kg ====
8 August

Preliminary 1/8
Adil Jan (PAK)	7
Alibek Prenov (KAZ)	2
Ryosuke Shimizu (JPN)	7
Hatta Mahamut (MAS)	4

Quarterfinals
Hendro Salim (INA)	10
Ahmad Al-Dousari (KUW)	2
Adil Jan (PAK)	8
Qu Gang (CHN)	11
Jin Min-kyu (KOR)	3
Ryosuke Shimizu (JPN)	8
Ammar Al-Sabsabi (SYR)	4
Mohamed Al-Abed (BRN)	1

Semifinals
Hendro Salim (INA)	6
Qu Gang (CHN)	2
Ryosuke Shimizu (JPN)	10
Ammar Al-Sabsabi (SYR)	2

Final
Hendro Salim (INA)	1
Ryosuke Shimizu (JPN)	4

Repechage 1
Jin Min-kyu (KOR)	4
Hatta Mahamut (MAS)	12

Repechage final
Ahmad Al-Dousari (KUW)	10
Qu Gang (CHN)	5
Ammar Al-Sabsabi (SYR)	3
Hatta Mahamut (MAS)	10

==== +84 kg ====
8 August

Quarterfinals		Semifinals		Final
		Khalid Khalidov (KAZ)	2
Rustam Ashurov (UZB)	4	Rustam Ashurov (UZB)	1
Shadi Al-Ali (SYR)	1			Khalid Khalidov (KAZ)	3
Ahmad Bilal (KUW)	1			Li Peng (CHN)	1
Amer Abu Afifeh (JOR)	9	Amer Abu Afifeh (JOR)	3
Vijay Karthik (IND)	1	Li Peng (CHN)	4
Li Peng (CHN)	5

Repechage final
Bye
Rustam Ashurov (UZB)
Amer Abu Afifeh (JOR)	8
Vijay Karthik (IND)	0

=== Women ===
==== 50 kg ====
6 August

Preliminary 1/8
Yanisa Torrattanawathana (THA)	8
Diah Puspitasari (INA)	1
Đào Thị Thoan (VIE)	3
Valena Valentina (IND)	0
Dinusha Kumari (SRI)	0
Chansouda Phetsiriseng (LAO)	1

Quarterfinals
Li Hong (CHN)	0
Chen Yen-hui (TPE)	3
Yanisa Torrattanawathana (THA)	3
Maalani Chandran (MAS)	1
Kou Man I (MAC)	4
Đào Thị Thoan (VIE)	2
Chansouda Phetsiriseng (LAO)	1
Aisha Sabitova (KAZ)	3

Semifinals
Chen Yen-hui (TPE)	3
Yanisa Torrattanawathana (THA)	2
Kou Man I (MAC)	1
Aisha Sabitova (KAZ)	0

Final
Chen Yen-hui (TPE)	0
Kou Man I (MAC)	1

Repechage final
Li Hong (CHN)	3
Yanisa Torrattanawathana (THA)	0
Aisha Sabitova (KAZ)	1
Đào Thị Thoan (VIE)	3

==== 55 kg ====
7 August

Preliminary 1/8
Lưu Thị Thúy Hoa (VIE)	3
Lin Wan-ching (TPE)	0
Tantri Widyasari (INA)	1
Marna Pabillore (PHI)	5
Chandrika Seneviratne (SRI)	0
Roji Nagarkoti (NEP)	2
Jang So-young (KOR)	3
Miki Kobayashi (JPN)	7
Manovanh Keomany (LAO)	0
Syiem Linza Fenny (IND)	2
Chen Dan (CHN)	DQ
Sharmin Sultana (BAN)
Venera Zhetibay (KAZ)	1
Ma Man Sum (HKG)	0
Kanokwan Norasetkul (THA)	3
Vathana Gopalasamy (MAS)	8

Quarterfinals
Lưu Thị Thúy Hoa (VIE)	4
Marna Pabillore (PHI)	3
Roji Nagarkoti (NEP)	0
Miki Kobayashi (JPN)	8
Syiem Linza Fenny (IND)	0
Chen Dan (CHN)	2
Venera Zhetibay (KAZ)	1
Vathana Gopalasamy (MAS)	0

Semifinals
Lưu Thị Thúy Hoa (VIE)	3
Miki Kobayashi (JPN)	9
Chen Dan (CHN)	4
Venera Zhetibay (KAZ)	0

Final
Miki Kobayashi (JPN)	2
Chen Dan (CHN)	3

Repechage 1
Jang So-young (KOR)	8
Roji Nagarkoti (NEP)	0
Syiem Linza Fenny (IND)	DQ
Sharmin Sultana (BAN)

Repechage final
Jang So-young (KOR)	3
Lưu Thị Thúy Hoa (VIE)	4
Venera Zhetibay (KAZ)	7
Syiem Linza Fenny (IND)	1

==== 61 kg ====
8 August

Preliminary 1/8
Manar Shath (JOR)	3
Piyanan Ratbandit (THA)	2
Choi Cho-rong (KOR)	5
Chang Ting (TPE)	3
Sayuri Maejima (JPN)	5
Mae Soriano (PHI)	0
Mahesha Dulangani de Soyza (SRI)	0
Paihpha Phommachan (LAO)	2
Lyutsiya Baybulatova (UZB)
Feng Lanlan (CHN)	DQ

Quarterfinals
Tara Gurung (NEP)	0
Manar Shath (JOR)	5
Choi Cho-rong (KOR)	0
Chan Ka Man (HKG)	8
Sayuri Maejima (JPN)	8
Paihpha Phommachan (LAO)	0
Feng Lanlan (CHN)	0
Bùi Thị Triều (VIE)	2

Semifinals
Manar Shath (JOR)	2
Chan Ka Man (HKG)	3
Sayuri Maejima (JPN)	5
Bùi Thị Triều (VIE)	4

Final
Chan Ka Man (HKG)	3
Sayuri Maejima (JPN)	8

Repechage 1
Paihpha Phommachan (LAO)	0
Mae Soriano (PHI)	4

Repechage final
Choi Cho-rong (KOR)	2
Manar Shath (JOR)	3
Bùi Thị Triều (VIE)	4
Mae Soriano (PHI)	2

==== +61 kg ====
7 August

Quarterfinals		Semifinals		Final
Paula Carion (MAC)	1
Simmi Batta (IND)	0	Paula Carion (MAC)	1
Park Jin-hwa (KOR)	0	Buthaina Al-Mahsiri (JOR)	0
Buthaina Al-Mahsiri (JOR)	2			Paula Carion (MAC)	0
Jamaliah Jamaludin (MAS)	2			Jamaliah Jamaludin (MAS)	8
Wiwi Pertiwi (INA)	1	Jamaliah Jamaludin (MAS)	2
Gaukhar Chaikuzova (KAZ)	1	Sofiya Kaspulatova (UZB)	0
Sofiya Kaspulatova (UZB)	9

Repechage final
Simmi Batta (IND)	1
Buthaina Al-Mahsiri (JOR)	2
Sofiya Kaspulatova (UZB)	8
Wiwi Pertiwi (INA)	0
