= Wushu at the 2009 Asian Martial Arts Games =

- Venue: Silpa-archa Gymnasium
- Dates: 5–8 August 2009

The Wushu and Kungfu competition at the 2009 Asian Martial Arts Games took place from 5 August to 8 August at the Silpa-archa Gymnasium, in Suphanburi Sports Center. Three events were cancelled due to lack of entries.

== Medalists ==
=== Duilian ===
Event	Gold	Silver	Bronze
Men's barehand	Vietnam; Nguyễn Huy Thành; Trần Đức Trọng; Trần Xuân Hiệp	India; H. Dewan Singh; N. Roshan Singh; Somorjit Sagolsem	Sri Lanka; Asanka Sujeewan; Ravindra Silva; Chandula Wickramarathne
Men's weapons	China; Shao Hongshuo; Zhang Chenghao; Zhao Yongjin	Indonesia; Johannes Bie; Aldy Lukman	Hong Kong; Cheng Chung Hang; Leung Ka Wai; Tang Siu Kong
Men's weapons	China; Shao Hongshuo; Zhang Chenghao; Zhao Yongjin	Indonesia; Johannes Bie; Aldy Lukman	Thailand; Baramee Kulsawadmongkol; Pitaya Saeyang; Sujinoa Saeyang
Women's weapons	China; Sun Wenting; Tong Hui; Zheng Siwen	Vietnam; Vũ Thùy Linh; Vũ Trà My	Hong Kong; Kwan Ning Wai; Yuen Ka Ying; Zheng Tianhui
Women's weapons	China; Sun Wenting; Tong Hui; Zheng Siwen	Vietnam; Vũ Thùy Linh; Vũ Trà My	India; A. Sanathoibi Chanu; Ayapana Toshibala; Y. Sapana Devi

=== Men's sanshou ===
Event	Gold	Silver	Bronze
52 kg	Khwanyuen Chanthra; Thailand	Gulshan Kumar; India	Dembert Arcita; Philippines
52 kg	Khwanyuen Chanthra; Thailand	Gulshan Kumar; India	Wai Yan Lin; Myanmar
56 kg	Kim Jun-yul; South Korea	Apisak Rongpichai; Thailand	Po Seuyalom; Laos
56 kg	Kim Jun-yul; South Korea	Apisak Rongpichai; Thailand	Wong Ting Hong; Hong Kong
60 kg	Zhang Dajun; China	Yu Hyeon-seok; South Korea	Maratab Ali Shah; Pakistan
60 kg	Zhang Dajun; China	Yu Hyeon-seok; South Korea	Rahmat Junaidi Sukamto; Indonesia
65 kg	Zhang Junyong; China	Mark Eddiva; Philippines	Kurbangeldi Atageldiýew; Turkmenistan
65 kg	Zhang Junyong; China	Mark Eddiva; Philippines	Nguyễn Văn Tuấn; Vietnam

=== Women's sanshou ===
Event	Gold	Silver	Bronze
48 kg	Chutdao Chaimala; Thailand	Yumnam Sanathoi Devi; India	Kim A-ri; South Korea
48 kg	Chutdao Chaimala; Thailand	Yumnam Sanathoi Devi; India	Nguyễn Thị Bích; Vietnam
52 kg	Mary Jane Estimar; Philippines	Si Si Sein; Myanmar	Nazia Parvaiz; Pakistan
52 kg	Mary Jane Estimar; Philippines	Si Si Sein; Myanmar	Kanjana Posuwon; Thailand
56 kg	Zhang Hua; China	Wangkhem Sandhyarani Devi; India	Moria Manalu; Indonesia
56 kg	Zhang Hua; China	Wangkhem Sandhyarani Devi; India	None awarded
60 kg	Gao Jingjing; China	Mariane Mariano; Philippines	Jharana Gurung; Nepal
60 kg	Gao Jingjing; China	Mariane Mariano; Philippines	None awarded

== Medal table ==
Rank	Nation	Gold	Silver	Bronze	Total
1	China (CHN)	6	0	0	6
2	Thailand (THA)	2	1	2	5
3	Philippines (PHI)	1	2	1	4
4	Vietnam (VIE)	1	1	2	4
5	South Korea (KOR)	1	1	1	3
6	India (IND)	0	4	1	5
7	Indonesia (INA)	0	1	2	3
8	Myanmar (MYA)	0	1	1	2
9	Hong Kong (HKG)	0	0	3	3
10	Pakistan (PAK)	0	0	2	2
11	Laos (LAO)	0	0	1	1
11	Nepal (NEP)	0	0	1	1
11	Sri Lanka (SRI)	0	0	1	1
11	Turkmenistan (TKM)	0	0	1	1
Totals (14 entries)		11	11	19	41

== Results ==
=== Duilian ===
==== Men's barehand ====
5 August

Rank	Team	Score
1st place, gold medalist(s)	Vietnam (VIE)	9.55
2nd place, silver medalist(s)	India (IND)	9.15
3rd place, bronze medalist(s)	Sri Lanka (SRI)	9.00

==== Men's weapons ====
5 August

Rank	Team	Score
1st place, gold medalist(s)	China (CHN)	9.75
2nd place, silver medalist(s)	Indonesia (INA)	9.52
3rd place, bronze medalist(s)	Hong Kong (HKG)	9.37
3rd place, bronze medalist(s)	Thailand (THA)	9.37
5	Uzbekistan (UZB)	9.22

==== Women's weapons ====
6 August

Rank	Team	Score
1st place, gold medalist(s)	China (CHN)	9.70
2nd place, silver medalist(s)	Vietnam (VIE)	9.40
3rd place, bronze medalist(s)	Hong Kong (HKG)	9.30
3rd place, bronze medalist(s)	India (IND)	9.30
5	Thailand (THA)	9.10

=== Men's sanshou ===
==== 52 kg ====
Quarterfinals; 5 August		Semifinals; 7 August		Final; 8 August
		Khwanyuen Chanthra (THA)	2
Dembert Arcita (PHI)	2	Dembert Arcita (PHI)	0
Sisuvanh Sivichith (LAO)	0			Khwanyuen Chanthra (THA)	2
Raj Kumar Rasaili (NEP)	0			Gulshan Kumar (IND)	0
Gulshan Kumar (IND)	2	Gulshan Kumar (IND)	2
		Wai Yan Lin (MYA)	0

==== 56 kg ====
Preliminary 1/8; 5 August
Khalid Hotak (AFG)	0
Phan Anh Thắng (VIE)	2
Apisak Rongpichai (THA)	DQ
Khaled Ali (KUW)
Kim Jun-yul (KOR)	2
Alaaeddin Al-Kayari (SYR)	0
Yuba Raj Gurung (NEP)	1
Wong Ting Hong (HKG)	2

Quarterfinals; 6 August
Po Seuyalom (LAO)	DQ
Phan Anh Thắng (VIE)
Apisak Rongpichai (THA)	DQ
Oscar Yaqut (INA)
Aziz Nuridodinov (UZB)	0
Kim Jun-yul (KOR)	2
Wong Ting Hong (HKG)	2
Ali Abdul-Zahra (IRQ)	0

Semifinals; 7 August
Po Seuyalom (LAO)
Apisak Rongpichai (THA)	DQ
Kim Jun-yul (KOR)	2
Wong Ting Hong (HKG)	0

Final; 8 August
Apisak Rongpichai (THA)	0
Kim Jun-yul (KOR)	2

==== 60 kg ====
Preliminary 1/8; 5 August
Maratab Ali Shah (PAK)	2
Rustam Abdullayev (KAZ)	0
M. Bimoljit Singh (IND)	2
Rustam Magdiev (UZB)	1
Zhang Dajun (CHN)	2
Li Sone Wai (HKG)	0

Quarterfinals; 6 August
Jehad Al-Hasoun (SYR)	0
Maratab Ali Shah (PAK)	2
Taşli Sariýew (TKM)	0
Yu Hyeon-seok (KOR)	2
Rahmat Junaidi Sukamto (INA)	2
M. Bimoljit Singh (IND)	0
Zhang Dajun (CHN)	2
Ahmad Qaid (KUW)	0

Semifinals; 7 August
Maratab Ali Shah (PAK)	0
Yu Hyeon-seok (KOR)	2
Rahmat Junaidi Sukamto (INA)
Zhang Dajun (CHN)	DQ

Final; 8 August
Yu Hyeon-seok (KOR)	1
Zhang Dajun (CHN)	2

==== 65 kg ====
Preliminary 1/8; 5 August
Rinat Livensho (KAZ)	2
Tariq Hamdi (JOR)	0

Quarterfinals; 6 August
Mark Eddiva (PHI)	2
Rinat Livensho (KAZ)	0
Faez Mohammed (IRQ)
Kurbangeldi Atageldiýew (TKM)	DQ
Asghar Hussain (PAK)	0
Nguyễn Văn Tuấn (VIE)	2
Zhang Junyong (CHN)	2
Mohammad Mahfooz Wafa (AFG)	0

Semifinals; 7 August
Mark Eddiva (PHI)	2
Kurbangeldi Atageldiýew (TKM)	0
Nguyễn Văn Tuấn (VIE)
Zhang Junyong (CHN)	DQ

Final; 8 August
Mark Eddiva (PHI)	0
Zhang Junyong (CHN)	2

=== Women's sanshou ===
==== 48 kg ====
Preliminary 1/8; 5 August
Elina Chaudhary (NEP)	0
Yumnam Sanathoi Devi (IND)	2
Toyla (LAO)	2
Chao Ho Yee (HKG)	0

Quarterfinals; 6 August
Rukhsana Hanif (PAK)	0
Yumnam Sanathoi Devi (IND)	2
Kim A-ri (KOR)	2
Hotma Dearma Purba (INA)	0
Naw Mar Htun (MYA)	0
Nguyễn Thị Bích (VIE)	2
Toyla (LAO)	0
Chutdao Chaimala (THA)	2

Semifinals; 7 August
Yumnam Sanathoi Devi (IND)	2
Kim A-ri (KOR)	0
Nguyễn Thị Bích (VIE)	1
Chutdao Chaimala (THA)	2

Final; 8 August
Yumnam Sanathoi Devi (IND)	1
Chutdao Chaimala (THA)	2

==== 52 kg ====
Quarterfinals; 5 August		Semifinals; 7 August		Final; 8 August
		Nazia Parvaiz (PAK)	0
Si Si Sein (MYA)	2	Si Si Sein (MYA)	2
Nasiba Ruzimatova (UZB)	0			Si Si Sein (MYA)	0
Chim Tin Yan (HKG)	0			Mary Jane Estimar (PHI)	2
Mary Jane Estimar (PHI)	2	Mary Jane Estimar (PHI)	2
Lee Jung-hee (KOR)	0	Kanjana Posuwon (THA)	0
Kanjana Posuwon (THA)	2

==== 56 kg ====
6–8 August

Pos	Athlete	Pld	W	L	Pts	CHN	IND	INA
1	Zhang Hua (CHN)	2	2	0	4	—	2–0	2–0
2	Wangkhem Sandhyarani Devi (IND)	2	1	1	2	0–2	—	2–0
3	Manalu (INA)	2	0	2	0	0–2	0–2	—

Source: Official website

==== 60 kg ====
6–8 August

Pos	Athlete	Pld	W	L	Pts	CHN	PHI	NEP
1	Gao Jingjing (CHN)	2	2	0	4	—	2–0	2–0
2	Mariane Mariano (PHI)	2	1	1	2	0–2	—	2–0
3	Jharana Gurung (NEP)	2	0	2	0	0–2	0–2	—

Source: Official website
