= Taekwondo at the 2009 Asian Martial Arts Games =

Taekwondo competition

- Venue: Indoor Stadium Huamark
- Dates: 2–5 August 2009

The Taekwondo competition at the 2009 Asian Martial Arts Games took place from 2 August to 5 August at the Indoor Stadium Huamark.

== Medalists ==
=== Men ===
Event	Gold	Silver	Bronze
Finweight −54 kg	Abdulrahim Abdulhameed; Bahrain	Kim Jae-bong; South Korea	Jerranat Nakaviroj; Thailand
Finweight −54 kg	Abdulrahim Abdulhameed; Bahrain	Kim Jae-bong; South Korea	Mohammad Al-Bakhit; Jordan
Flyweight −58 kg	Pen-ek Karaket; Thailand	Lee Woo-linara; South Korea	Husam Suleiman; Jordan
Flyweight −58 kg	Pen-ek Karaket; Thailand	Lee Woo-linara; South Korea	Rustamjon Pulatov; Uzbekistan
Bantamweight −62 kg	Jeffrey Figueroa; Philippines	Hasan Rezai; Afghanistan	Nattapong Tewawetchapong; Thailand
Bantamweight −62 kg	Jeffrey Figueroa; Philippines	Hasan Rezai; Afghanistan	Mahmood Adel; Bahrain
Featherweight −67 kg	Lo Tsung-jui; Chinese Taipei	Kairat Sarymsakov; Kazakhstan	Masoud Hashemi; Afghanistan
Featherweight −67 kg	Lo Tsung-jui; Chinese Taipei	Kairat Sarymsakov; Kazakhstan	Nacha Punthong; Thailand
Lightweight −72 kg	Nesar Ahmad Bahave; Afghanistan	Nabil Talal; Jordan	Tseng Ching-hsiang; Chinese Taipei
Lightweight −72 kg	Nesar Ahmad Bahave; Afghanistan	Nabil Talal; Jordan	Taisei Hojo; Japan
Welterweight −78 kg	Lee Gyu-jin; South Korea	Marlon Avenido; Philippines	Basuki Nugroho; Indonesia
Welterweight −78 kg	Lee Gyu-jin; South Korea	Marlon Avenido; Philippines	Liu Chang; China
Middleweight −84 kg	Hwang Dae-sung; South Korea	Ding He; China	Nguyễn Trọng Cường; Vietnam
Middleweight −84 kg	Hwang Dae-sung; South Korea	Ding He; China	Gayan Kumara; Sri Lanka
Heavyweight +84 kg	Arman Chilmanov; Kazakhstan	Rizal Samsir; Indonesia	Abdulkarim Moosa; Bahrain
Heavyweight +84 kg	Arman Chilmanov; Kazakhstan	Rizal Samsir; Indonesia	Elias El-Hidari; Lebanon

=== Women ===
Event	Gold	Silver	Bronze
Finweight −47 kg	Kim Min-jung; South Korea	Buttree Puedpong; Thailand	Justina Lei; Macau
Finweight −47 kg	Kim Min-jung; South Korea	Buttree Puedpong; Thailand	Văn Thị Kim Thu; Vietnam
Flyweight −51 kg	Jang Eun-suk; South Korea	Trần Thị Ngọc Trúc; Vietnam	Prapaporn Sangnarin; Thailand
Flyweight −51 kg	Jang Eun-suk; South Korea	Trần Thị Ngọc Trúc; Vietnam	Shafiqa Kargar; Afghanistan
Bantamweight −55 kg	Nguyễn Thị Hoài Thu; Vietnam	Kuan I-wen; Chinese Taipei	Karla Alava; Philippines
Bantamweight −55 kg	Nguyễn Thị Hoài Thu; Vietnam	Kuan I-wen; Chinese Taipei	Saule Sardarova; Kazakhstan
Featherweight −59 kg	Lei Jie; China	Zarina Shamshatkyzy; Kazakhstan	Andrea Paoli; Lebanon
Featherweight −59 kg	Lei Jie; China	Zarina Shamshatkyzy; Kazakhstan	Nghiêm Thị Huyền; Vietnam
Lightweight −63 kg	Zhang Hua; China	Kaltham Jasim; Bahrain	Yekaterina Dmitriyeva; Kazakhstan
Lightweight −63 kg	Zhang Hua; China	Kaltham Jasim; Bahrain	Karma Dema; Bhutan
Welterweight −67 kg	Gulnafis Aitmukhambetova; Kazakhstan	Shaden Thweib; Jordan	Catur Yuni Riyaningsih; Indonesia
Welterweight −67 kg	Gulnafis Aitmukhambetova; Kazakhstan	Shaden Thweib; Jordan	Shao Hua; China
Middleweight −72 kg	Yeh Sung-chiang; Chinese Taipei	Kirstie Alora; Philippines	Jacqueline Quek; Singapore
Middleweight −72 kg	Yeh Sung-chiang; Chinese Taipei	Kirstie Alora; Philippines	Yang Ping; China
Heavyweight +72 kg	Rapatkorn Prasopsuk; Thailand	Evgeniya Karimova; Uzbekistan	Oh Min-ah; South Korea
Heavyweight +72 kg	Rapatkorn Prasopsuk; Thailand	Evgeniya Karimova; Uzbekistan	Eka Sahara; Indonesia

== Medal table ==
Rank	Nation	Gold	Silver	Bronze	Total
1	South Korea (KOR)	4	2	1	7
2	Kazakhstan (KAZ)	2	2	2	6
3	Thailand (THA)	2	1	4	7
4	China (CHN)	2	1	3	6
5	Chinese Taipei (TPE)	2	1	1	4
6	Philippines (PHI)	1	2	1	4
7	Vietnam (VIE)	1	1	3	5
8	Afghanistan (AFG)	1	1	2	4
8	Bahrain (BRN)	1	1	2	4
10	Jordan (JOR)	0	2	2	4
11	Indonesia (INA)	0	1	3	4
12	Uzbekistan (UZB)	0	1	1	2
13	Lebanon (LIB)	0	0	2	2
14	Bhutan (BHU)	0	0	1	1
14	Japan (JPN)	0	0	1	1
14	Macau (MAC)	0	0	1	1
14	Singapore (SIN)	0	0	1	1
14	Sri Lanka (SRI)	0	0	1	1
Totals (18 entries)		16	16	32	64

== Results ==
=== Men ===
==== 54 kg ====
2 August

Preliminary 1/16
Renat Kuralbayev (KAZ)	1–4	Jerranat Nakaviroj (THA)
Mohammad Al-Bakhit (JOR)	4–1	Tameem Al-Kubati (YEM)
Chhoun Sarun (CAM)	1–2	Marc Arakilo (LIB)

Preliminary 1/8
Tandin Dendup (BHU)	−2
Jerranat Nakaviroj (THA)	5
Jason Tan (SIN)	7
Ho Ka Kin (MAC)	0
Harith Al-Harthy (OMA)	1
Şohrat Orazgeldiýew (TKM)	4
Kim Jae-bong (KOR)	0
Japoy Lizardo (PHI)	−1
N. Ibothe Singh (IND)	−1
Mohammad Al-Bakhit (JOR)	4
Ajaiman Al-Ojaiman (KUW)	3
Mohamed Dhair (QAT)	1
Abdulrahim Abdulhameed (BRN)	2
Ghazanfar Ali (PAK)	0
Marc Arakilo (LIB)	2
Bounlerth Talasan (LAO)	1

Quarterfinals
Jerranat Nakaviroj (THA)	6
Jason Tan (SIN)	−1
Şohrat Orazgeldiýew (TKM)
Kim Jae-bong (KOR)	KO
Mohammad Al-Bakhit (JOR)	2
Ajaiman Al-Ojaiman (KUW)	1
Abdulrahim Abdulhameed (BRN)	2
Marc Arakilo (LIB)	1

Semifinals
Jerranat Nakaviroj (THA)	2
Kim Jae-bong (KOR)	2
Mohammad Al-Bakhit (JOR)	2
Abdulrahim Abdulhameed (BRN)	4

Final
Kim Jae-bong (KOR)	0
Abdulrahim Abdulhameed (BRN)	1

==== 58 kg ====
3 August

Preliminary 1/16
Phailath Thammavongsa (LAO)	DQ	Hamood Al-Jabri (OMA)
Lee Woo-linara (KOR)	7–0	Sugath Weraduwage (SRI)
Tufan Kumar Poddar (IND)	2–1	Faheem Jawad Butt (PAK)

Preliminary 1/8
Pen-ek Karaket (THA)	5
Phailath Thammavongsa (LAO)	−1
Lin Shang-te (TPE)	7
Ahmed Amanulla (MDV)	0
Sakumar Basnet (NEP)	DQ
Amran Saida (PLE)
Husam Suleiman (JOR)	2
Mahmood Haidari (AFG)	0
Yereth Polyjearpus (INA)	0
Lee Woo-linara (KOR)	5
Aslan Batykulov (KAZ)	7
Aung Nyein Chan (MYA)	0
Sonam Tshewang (BHU)	−1
Rustamjon Pulatov (UZB)	6
Tufan Kumar Poddar (IND)	5
Nicholas Lau (SIN)	1

Quarterfinals
Pen-ek Karaket (THA)	7
Lin Shang-te (TPE)	0
Sakumar Basnet (NEP)	3
Husam Suleiman (JOR)	4
Lee Woo-linara (KOR)	2
Aslan Batykulov (KAZ)	1
Rustamjon Pulatov (UZB)	3
Tufan Kumar Poddar (IND)	0

Semifinals
Pen-ek Karaket (THA)	7
Husam Suleiman (JOR)	0
Lee Woo-linara (KOR)	7
Rustamjon Pulatov (UZB)	0

Final
Pen-ek Karaket (THA)	0
Lee Woo-linara (KOR)	−1

==== 62 kg ====
4 August

Preliminary 1/16
Kinley Rabgay (BHU)	7–0	Nihal Wickramaratna (SRI)

Preliminary 1/8
Xaysavanh Chanthalangsy (LAO)	3
Kinley Rabgay (BHU)	1
Nattapong Tewawetchapong (THA)	5
Nguyễn Thái Hoàng Minh (VIE)	4
Jeffrey Figueroa (PHI)	7
Oken Meitei Mutum (IND)	0
Muaadh Naji (YEM)	6
Poon Chun Ho (HKG)	5
Mery Wandra (INA)	−1
Mahmood Adel (BRN)	3
Kenan Sharabi (SYR)	WD
Klimentii Kim (KGZ)
Jordan Tay (SIN)	−1
Hasan Rezai (AFG)	6
Pang Haowen (CHN)	2
Naser Al-Hurais (KUW)	1

Quarterfinals
Xaysavanh Chanthalangsy (LAO)	0
Nattapong Tewawetchapong (THA)	7
Jeffrey Figueroa (PHI)	7
Muaadh Naji (YEM)	3
Mahmood Adel (BRN)	5
Kenan Sharabi (SYR)	−1
Hasan Rezai (AFG)	3
Pang Haowen (CHN)	2

Semifinals
Nattapong Tewawetchapong (THA)	2
Jeffrey Figueroa (PHI)	3
Mahmood Adel (BRN)	0
Hasan Rezai (AFG)	4

Final
Jeffrey Figueroa (PHI)	8
Hasan Rezai (AFG)	7

==== 67 kg ====
5 August

Preliminary 1/8
Kusung Wangdi (BHU)	11
Anit Arjun Bhagat (IND)	5
Farkhod Negmatov (TJK)
Kairat Sarymsakov (KAZ)	DQ
Masoud Hashemi (AFG)	5
Mahmood Al-Basri (BRN)	−1
Lei Kuong Peng (MAC)	7
Ahmed Mazin (MDV)	0
Maksim Rafalovich (UZB)	3
Lo Tsung-jui (TPE)	4
Khalid Al-Mahruqi (OMA)	3
Oraz Rejebow (TKM)	−1
Nacha Punthong (THA)	WD
Rasul Abduraim (KGZ)
Mohammad Abulibdeh (JOR)	6
Aashish Maharjan (NEP)	−1

Quarterfinals
Kusung Wangdi (BHU)
Kairat Sarymsakov (KAZ)	WD
Masoud Hashemi (AFG)	5
Lei Kuong Peng (MAC)	0
Lo Tsung-jui (TPE)	4
Khalid Al-Mahruqi (OMA)	−1
Nacha Punthong (THA)	4
Mohammad Abulibdeh (JOR)	1

Semifinals
Kairat Sarymsakov (KAZ)	5
Masoud Hashemi (AFG)	4
Lo Tsung-jui (TPE)	5
Nacha Punthong (THA)	3

Final
Kairat Sarymsakov (KAZ)	−1
Lo Tsung-jui (TPE)	2

==== 72 kg ====
5 August

Preliminary 1/8
Dmitriy Kim (UZB)	WD
Denis Dawydow (TKM)
Nesar Ahmad Bahave (AFG)	KO
Anura Bandara (SRI)
Javed Karim (PAK)	3
Win Tun Lin (MYA)	5
Sultan Al-Mutairi (KUW)	5
Yeung Tsz Wing (HKG)	0

Quarterfinals
Tseng Ching-hsiang (TPE)	6
Dmitriy Kim (UZB)	5
Nesar Ahmad Bahave (AFG)	DQ
Ahmed Ali (PLE)
Taisei Hojo (JPN)	4
Win Tun Lin (MYA)	3
Sultan Al-Mutairi (KUW)	2
Nabil Talal (JOR)	5

Semifinals
Tseng Ching-hsiang (TPE)	4
Nesar Ahmad Bahave (AFG)	6
Taisei Hojo (JPN)	2
Nabil Talal (JOR)	5

Final
Nesar Ahmad Bahave (AFG)	5
Nabil Talal (JOR)	4

==== 78 kg ====
4 August

Preliminary 1/8
Võ Hoàng Giao (VIE)	4
Nidhal Al-Said (OMA)	−3
Jasur Baykuziyev (UZB)	2
Kenta Miyagawa (JPN)	1
Arif Mahmood (PAK)	DQ
Alisher Gulov (TJK)

Quarterfinals
Marlon Avenido (PHI)	3
Võ Hoàng Giao (VIE)	1
Akram Sadykov (KGZ)
Basuki Nugroho (INA)	DQ
Liu Chang (CHN)	3
Jasur Baykuziyev (UZB)	2
Arif Mahmood (PAK)	−1
Lee Gyu-jin (KOR)	6

Semifinals
Marlon Avenido (PHI)	7
Basuki Nugroho (INA)	2
Liu Chang (CHN)	−1
Lee Gyu-jin (KOR)	1

Final
Marlon Avenido (PHI)	2
Lee Gyu-jin (KOR)	4

==== 84 kg ====
3 August

Quarterfinals		Semifinals		Final
		Nguyễn Trọng Cường (VIE)	0
Yuan Ming-che (TPE)	2	Hwang Dae-sung (KOR)	2
Hwang Dae-sung (KOR)	3			Hwang Dae-sung (KOR)	2
Bader Al-Enezi (KUW)	2			Ding He (CHN)	0
Ding He (CHN)	5	Ding He (CHN)	4
Gayan Kumara (SRI)	1	Gayan Kumara (SRI)	−1
Chen Zhiquan (MAC)	0

==== +84 kg ====
2 August

Preliminary 1/8
Akmal Irgashev (UZB)	1
Abdulqader Al-Adhami (QAT)	2
Đinh Quang Toàn (VIE)	1
Alexander Briones (PHI)	0

Quarterfinals
Abdulkarim Moosa (BRN)	2
Abdulqader Al-Adhami (QAT)	1
Sorn Elit (CAM)	−1
Rizal Samsir (INA)	4
Arman Chilmanov (KAZ)	2
Dong Wansheng (CHN)	0
Đinh Quang Toàn (VIE)	2
Elias El-Hidari (LIB)	3

Semifinals
Abdulkarim Moosa (BRN)	3
Rizal Samsir (INA)	5
Arman Chilmanov (KAZ)	3
Elias El-Hidari (LIB)	1

Final
Rizal Samsir (INA)	2
Arman Chilmanov (KAZ)	6

=== Women ===
==== 47 kg ====
2 August

Preliminary 1/8
Buttree Puedpong (THA)	3
Thiri Tintluin (MYA)	−1
Kim Min-jung (KOR)	7
Pouthasone Kanthonglath (LAO)	0
Taiba Qasem (KUW)	0
Remya Ramankutty (IND)	5

Quarterfinals
Maham Aftab (PAK)	0
Buttree Puedpong (THA)	7
Justina Lei (MAC)	3
Deena Mahboob (BRN)	1
Crizobelle Vargas (PHI)	0
Kim Min-jung (KOR)	7
Remya Ramankutty (IND)	2
Văn Thị Kim Thu (VIE)	3

Semifinals
Buttree Puedpong (THA)	7
Justina Lei (MAC)	0
Kim Min-jung (KOR)	4
Văn Thị Kim Thu (VIE)	2

Final
Buttree Puedpong (THA)	1
Kim Min-jung (KOR)	2

==== 51 kg ====
3 August

Preliminary 1/8
Liao Wei-chun (TPE)	1
Jang Eun-suk (KOR)	2
Soe Soe Myar (MYA)	0
Erika Kasahara (JPN)	4
Prapaporn Sangnarin (THA)	7
Chhoeung Puthearim (CAM)	0
Pooja Bhalekar (IND)	−1
Trần Thị Ngọc Trúc (VIE)	6
Lanetar Quek (SIN)	8
Kuenzang Choki (BHU)	1
Veronika Dedegtiareva (KGZ)
Shafiqa Kargar (AFG)	DQ

Quarterfinals
Manivanh Khounviseth (LAO)	0
Jang Eun-suk (KOR)	5
Erika Kasahara (JPN)	4
Prapaporn Sangnarin (THA)	5
Trần Thị Ngọc Trúc (VIE)	6
Lanetar Quek (SIN)	0
Shafiqa Kargar (AFG)	1
Apsara Karki (NEP)	0

Semifinals
Jang Eun-suk (KOR)	2
Prapaporn Sangnarin (THA)	0
Trần Thị Ngọc Trúc (VIE)	7
Shafiqa Kargar (AFG)	0

Final
Jang Eun-suk (KOR)	3
Trần Thị Ngọc Trúc (VIE)	0

==== 55 kg ====
4 August

Preliminary 1/8
Cosette Basbous (LIB)	2
Natthaya Sangsasiton (THA)	3
Nila Ahmadi (AFG)	3
Farah Al-Assad (JOR)	2
Kuan I-wen (TPE)	8
Honami Kobayashi (JPN)	3
Yeshey Choden (BHU)	−1
Xaykaseng Phonvilay (LAO)	4
Choi Sun-hee (KOR)	1
Nguyễn Thị Hoài Thu (VIE)	3
Sabina Maharjan (NEP)	2
Saule Sardarova (KAZ)	2

Quarterfinals
Karla Alava (PHI)	3
Natthaya Sangsasiton (THA)	2
Nila Ahmadi (AFG)	0
Kuan I-wen (TPE)	4
Xaykaseng Phonvilay (LAO)	−1
Nguyễn Thị Hoài Thu (VIE)	5
Saule Sardarova (KAZ)	5
Thejaswini Hathikkatti Balaraj (IND)	0

Semifinals
Karla Alava (PHI)	1
Kuan I-wen (TPE)	2
Nguyễn Thị Hoài Thu (VIE)	4
Saule Sardarova (KAZ)	1

Final
Kuan I-wen (TPE)	2
Nguyễn Thị Hoài Thu (VIE)	6

==== 59 kg ====
5 August

Preliminary 1/8
Zarina Shamshatkyzy (KAZ)	7
P. Rekha Devi (IND)	0
Lei Jie (CHN)	7
Denise Thong (SIN)	0
Chang Ting-wei (TPE)	3
Al-Yasar Matar (JOR)	4

Quarterfinals
Nurul Fadlillah (INA)	2
Zarina Shamshatkyzy (KAZ)	3
Andrea Paoli (LIB)	5
Dilobar Saydullaeva (UZB)	4
Homaira Mohammadi (AFG)
Lei Jie (CHN)	WD
Al-Yasar Matar (JOR)	1
Nghiêm Thị Huyền (VIE)	2

Semifinals
Zarina Shamshatkyzy (KAZ)	4
Andrea Paoli (LIB)	3
Lei Jie (CHN)	5
Nghiêm Thị Huyền (VIE)	3

Final
Zarina Shamshatkyzy (KAZ)	0
Lei Jie (CHN)	7

==== 63 kg ====
5 August

Quarterfinals		Semifinals		Final
		Yekaterina Dmitriyeva (KAZ)	4
Maria Camille Manalo (PHI)	0	Zhang Hua (CHN)	11
Zhang Hua (CHN)	7			Zhang Hua (CHN)	7
Farzana Zulfiqar (PAK)	−1			Kaltham Jasim (BRN)	0
Kaltham Jasim (BRN)	6	Kaltham Jasim (BRN)	5
		Karma Dema (BHU)	1

==== 67 kg ====
4 August

Quarterfinals		Semifinals		Final
		Shaden Thweib (JOR)	6
Catur Yuni Riyaningsih (INA)	4	Catur Yuni Riyaningsih (INA)	4
Asia Batool (PAK)	−2			Shaden Thweib (JOR)	3
Gulnafis Aitmukhambetova (KAZ)	6			Gulnafis Aitmukhambetova (KAZ)	4
Abrar Al-Fahad (KUW)	1	Gulnafis Aitmukhambetova (KAZ)	6
		Shao Hua (CHN)	5

==== 72 kg ====
3 August

Quarterfinals		Semifinals		Final
		Yeh Sung-chiang (TPE)	7
Jacqueline Quek (SIN)	5	Jacqueline Quek (SIN)	0
Nadia Rasool (PAK)	−2			Yeh Sung-chiang (TPE)	3
Selviana Angelia Rosok (INA)	0			Kirstie Alora (PHI)	2
Kirstie Alora (PHI)	5	Kirstie Alora (PHI)	0
Sangay Wangmo (BHU)	0	Yang Ping (CHN)	−1
Yang Ping (CHN)	7

==== +72 kg ====
2 August

Semifinals		Final
Oh Min-ah (KOR)	1
Rapatkorn Prasopsuk (THA)	3	Rapatkorn Prasopsuk (THA)	3
Eka Sahara (INA)	−1	Evgeniya Karimova (UZB)	0
Evgeniya Karimova (UZB)	1
