= Kickboxing at the 2009 Asian Martial Arts Games =

- Venue: Jhanthana Yingyong Gymnasium
- Dates: 3–7 August 2009

The Kickboxing competition at the 2009 Asian Martial Arts Games took place from 3 August to 7 August at the Jhanthana Yingyong Gymnasium.

== Medalists ==
=== Full contact ===
Event	Gold	Silver	Bronze
Men's −51 kg	Mntsar Al-Mhid; Syria	Yerkebulan Omarov; Kazakhstan	Nguyễn Kế Nhân; Vietnam
Men's −51 kg	Mntsar Al-Mhid; Syria	Yerkebulan Omarov; Kazakhstan	Fouad Mohammed; Iraq
Men's −60 kg	Ali Ahmad Khalaf; Jordan	Nurgali Nauryzbayev; Kazakhstan	Ölziibatyn Törbayar; Mongolia
Men's −60 kg	Ali Ahmad Khalaf; Jordan	Nurgali Nauryzbayev; Kazakhstan	Allaberdi Omarow; Turkmenistan
Men's −71 kg	Sayan Zhakupov; Kazakhstan	Boldbaataryn Naadam; Mongolia	Mahmoud Al-Khatib; Jordan
Men's −71 kg	Sayan Zhakupov; Kazakhstan	Boldbaataryn Naadam; Mongolia	Ahmad Al-Zaabi; Syria
Men's −75 kg	Jad Al-Wahash; Jordan	Alisher Abdullayev; Uzbekistan	Sanjay Katode; India
Men's −75 kg	Jad Al-Wahash; Jordan	Alisher Abdullayev; Uzbekistan	Prajaksin Kaenjanbai; Thailand
Women's −56 kg	Nguyễn Thị Tuyết Mai; Vietnam	Wanlaya Pungtha; Thailand	Heena Nasreen Jahan; India
Women's −56 kg	Nguyễn Thị Tuyết Mai; Vietnam	Wanlaya Pungtha; Thailand	Imdira Omarova; Kazakhstan

=== Low kick ===
Event	Gold	Silver	Bronze
Men's −57 kg	Baurzhan Kudaibergenov; Kazakhstan	Pongphan Plensantia; Thailand	Đỗ Văn Thông; Vietnam
Men's −57 kg	Baurzhan Kudaibergenov; Kazakhstan	Pongphan Plensantia; Thailand	Moawiah Abuhammad; Jordan
Men's −63.5 kg	Direk Thongnoon; Thailand	Kemal Amanow; Turkmenistan	Salah Zabih; Iraq
Men's −63.5 kg	Direk Thongnoon; Thailand	Kemal Amanow; Turkmenistan	Nguyễn Văn Đức; Vietnam
Men's −71 kg	Maxut Ibrayev; Kazakhstan	Wongsawat Jantarangsu; Thailand	Arun Singh Charak; India
Men's −71 kg	Maxut Ibrayev; Kazakhstan	Wongsawat Jantarangsu; Thailand	Amjed Rahim; Iraq
Men's −81 kg	Dam Srichan; Thailand	Mohammad Al-Hariri; Syria	Ghulam Dastagir Panjshiri; Afghanistan
Men's −81 kg	Dam Srichan; Thailand	Mohammad Al-Hariri; Syria	Trần Thanh Tâm; Vietnam
Women's −52 kg	Laxmi Tyagi; India	Wilaiwan Namuangchan; Thailand	Nguyễn Thị Tuyết Dung; Vietnam
Women's −52 kg	Laxmi Tyagi; India	Wilaiwan Namuangchan; Thailand	Zhadyra Kuanysheva; Kazakhstan

== Medal table ==
Rank	Nation	Gold	Silver	Bronze	Total
1	Kazakhstan (KAZ)	3	2	2	7
2	Thailand (THA)	2	4	1	7
3	Jordan (JOR)	2	0	2	4
4	Syria (SYR)	1	1	1	3
5	Vietnam (VIE)	1	0	5	6
6	India (IND)	1	0	3	4
7	Mongolia (MGL)	0	1	1	2
7	Turkmenistan (TKM)	0	1	1	2
9	Uzbekistan (UZB)	0	1	0	1
10	Iraq (IRQ)	0	0	3	3
11	Afghanistan (AFG)	0	0	1	1
Totals (11 entries)		10	10	20	40

== Results ==
=== Full contact ===
==== Men's 51 kg ====
1/4 finals 4 August
Borkhüügiin Myagmarsüren (MGL)	0
Mntsar Al-Mhid (SYR)	3

1/2 finals 5 August
Nguyễn Kế Nhân (VIE)	0
Yerkebulan Omarov (KAZ)	3
Fouad Mohammed (IRQ)	0
Mntsar Al-Mhid (SYR)	3

1/1 final 7 August
Yerkebulan Omarov (KAZ)	1
Mntsar Al-Mhid (SYR)	2

==== Men's 60 kg ====
1/4 finals 3 August
Ali Ahmad Khalaf (JOR)	3
Qayssar Shafi (IRQ)	0
Allaberdi Omarow (TKM)	3
Yaman Al-Jawabreh (SYR)	0

1/2 finals 5 August
Ölziibatyn Törbayar (MGL)	0
Ali Ahmad Khalaf (JOR)	3
Nurgali Nauryzbayev (KAZ)	3
Allaberdi Omarow (TKM)	0

1/1 final 7 August
Ali Ahmad Khalaf (JOR)	3
Nurgali Nauryzbayev (KAZ)	0

==== Men's 71 kg ====
1/4 finals 3 August
Khaled Al-Azemi (KUW)	0
Sayan Zhakupov (KAZ)	3
Mahmoud Al-Khatib (JOR)	WO
Hasan Al-Halabiya (PLE)
Laxman Koli (IND)
Boldbaataryn Naadam (MGL)	RSC

1/2 finals 5 August
Sayan Zhakupov (KAZ)	3
Mahmoud Al-Khatib (JOR)	0
Ahmad Al-Zaabi (SYR)	1
Boldbaataryn Naadam (MGL)	2

1/1 final 7 August
Sayan Zhakupov (KAZ)	RSC
Boldbaataryn Naadam (MGL)

==== Men's 75 kg ====
1/4 finals 4 August
Sanjay Katode (IND)	WO
Fadi Mustafa (PLE)
Alisher Abdullayev (UZB)	2
Mohammad Al-Qallaf (KUW)	1
Ahmad Al-Hamwi (SYR)	0
Jad Al-Wahash (JOR)	3
Mekan Hojageldiýew (TKM)	0
Prajaksin Kaenjanbai (THA)	3

1/2 finals 5 August
Sanjay Katode (IND)
Alisher Abdullayev (UZB)	RSC
Jad Al-Wahash (JOR)	3
Prajaksin Kaenjanbai (THA)	0

1/1 final 7 August
Alisher Abdullayev (UZB)	0
Jad Al-Wahash (JOR)	3

==== Women's 56 kg ====
1/2 finals 5 August		1/1 final 7 August
Nguyễn Thị Tuyết Mai (VIE)	RSC
Heena Nasreen Jahan (IND)		Nguyễn Thị Tuyết Mai (VIE)	3
Wanlaya Pungtha (THA)	3	Wanlaya Pungtha (THA)	0
Imdira Omarova (KAZ)	0

=== Low kick ===
==== Men's 57 kg ====
1/8 final 3 August
Omar Faroque (BAN)
Abdulrahman Al-Shammari (KUW)	KO
Đỗ Văn Thông (VIE)	3
Mohit Bhardwaj (IND)	0
Pongphan Plensantia (THA)	3
Chuluunbaataryn Shijir-Erdene (MGL)	0

1/4 finals 4 August
Abdulrahman Al-Shammari (KUW)	0
Baurzhan Kudaibergenov (KAZ)	3
Đỗ Văn Thông (VIE)	2
Paigham Gharanai (AFG)	1
Moawiah Abuhammad (JOR)	2
Sherzod Kadirov (UZB)	1
Pongphan Plensantia (THA)	3
Jeofrey Dalwidao (PHI)	0

1/2 finals 5 August
Baurzhan Kudaibergenov (KAZ)	WO
Đỗ Văn Thông (VIE)
Moawiah Abuhammad (JOR)	0
Pongphan Plensantia (THA)	3

1/1 final 7 August
Baurzhan Kudaibergenov (KAZ)	2
Pongphan Plensantia (THA)	1

==== Men's 63.5 kg ====
1/4 finals 3 August
Direk Thongnoon (THA)	2
Aday Abuhasoah (JOR)	1
Rashed Ahmad (KUW)
Nguyễn Văn Đức (VIE)	RSC

1/2 finals 5 August
Salah Zabih (IRQ)	0
Direk Thongnoon (THA)	3
Kemal Amanow (TKM)	2
Nguyễn Văn Đức (VIE)	1

1/1 final 7 August
Direk Thongnoon (THA)	3
Kemal Amanow (TKM)	0

==== Men's 71 kg ====
1/4 finals 3 August
Dilshod Sadykov (UZB)	1
Wongsawat Jantarangsu (THA)	2
Maxut Ibrayev (KAZ)	RSC
Ajmal Farahi (AFG)

1/2 finals 5 August
Arun Singh Charak (IND)
Wongsawat Jantarangsu (THA)	RSC
Amjed Rahim (IRQ)
Maxut Ibrayev (KAZ)	KO

1/1 final 7 August
Wongsawat Jantarangsu (THA)
Maxut Ibrayev (KAZ)	KO

==== Men's 81 kg ====
1/4 finals 4 August
Ghulam Dastagir Panjshiri (AFG)	RSC
Rajesh Dalal (IND)
Mohammad Al-Hariri (SYR)	KO
Nayef Qaid (KUW)

1/2 finals 5 August
Dam Srichan (THA)	KO
Ghulam Dastagir Panjshiri (AFG)
Trần Thanh Tâm (VIE)
Mohammad Al-Hariri (SYR)	AB

1/1 final 7 August
Dam Srichan (THA)	3
Mohammad Al-Hariri (SYR)	0

==== Women's 52 kg ====
1/4 finals 4 August
Sharmin Sultana (BAN)
Nguyễn Thị Tuyết Dung (VIE)	DSQ
Laxmi Tyagi (IND)	2
Saintögsiin Tungalag (MGL)	1

1/2 finals 5 August
Nguyễn Thị Tuyết Dung (VIE)	1
Wilaiwan Namuangchan (THA)	2
Laxmi Tyagi (IND)	3
Zhadyra Kuanysheva (KAZ)	0

1/1 final 7 August
Wilaiwan Namuangchan (THA)	1
Laxmi Tyagi (IND)	2
