= Judo at the 2009 Asian Martial Arts Games =

Judo competition

- Venue: Thai-Japanese Youth Center
- Dates: 2–3 August

The Judo competition at the 2009 Asian Martial Arts Games took place from 2 August to 3 August at the Thai-Japanese Youth Center.

== Medalists ==
=== Men ===
Event	Gold	Silver	Bronze
Extra lightweight −60 kg	Daisuke Asano; Japan	Davaadorjiin Tömörkhüleg; Mongolia	Kanat Baimbetov; Kazakhstan
Extra lightweight −60 kg	Daisuke Asano; Japan	Davaadorjiin Tömörkhüleg; Mongolia	Kim Ki-yong; South Korea
Half lightweight −66 kg	Yuki Hayano; Japan	Dölgööny Davaasüren; Mongolia	Ho Yu-chieh; Chinese Taipei
Half lightweight −66 kg	Yuki Hayano; Japan	Dölgööny Davaasüren; Mongolia	Nguyễn Quốc Hùng; Vietnam
Lightweight −73 kg	Bang Gui-man; South Korea	Huang Chun-ta; Chinese Taipei	Ramashrey Yadav; India
Lightweight −73 kg	Bang Gui-man; South Korea	Huang Chun-ta; Chinese Taipei	Shinji Kanaoka; Japan
Half middleweight −81 kg	Song Dae-nam; South Korea	Duman Aldiyev; Kazakhstan	Wu Chen-ying; Chinese Taipei
Half middleweight −81 kg	Song Dae-nam; South Korea	Duman Aldiyev; Kazakhstan	Waleed Hanafi; Qatar
Middleweight −90 kg	Kwon Young-woo; South Korea	Shun Saito; Japan	Khurshid Nabiev; Uzbekistan
Middleweight −90 kg	Kwon Young-woo; South Korea	Shun Saito; Japan	Ghanam Al-Dikan; Kuwait
Half heavyweight −100 kg	Krisna Bayu; Indonesia	Anil Kumar; India	Khaled Al-Araifi; Bahrain
Half heavyweight −100 kg	Krisna Bayu; Indonesia	Anil Kumar; India	Atit Puangwichean; Thailand
Heavyweight +100 kg	Yerzhan Shynkeyev; Kazakhstan	Panupong Prothien; Thailand	Sengsouly Manivong; Laos
Heavyweight +100 kg	Yerzhan Shynkeyev; Kazakhstan	Panupong Prothien; Thailand	Utkur Salyamov; Uzbekistan

=== Women ===
Event	Gold	Silver	Bronze
Extra lightweight −48 kg	Chung Jung-yeon; South Korea	Văn Ngọc Tú; Vietnam	Hsieh Pei-ling; Chinese Taipei
Extra lightweight −48 kg	Chung Jung-yeon; South Korea	Văn Ngọc Tú; Vietnam	Tombi Devi; India
Half lightweight −52 kg	Lenariya Mingazova; Kazakhstan	Yuliati; Indonesia	Kalpana Devi Thoudam; India
Half lightweight −52 kg	Lenariya Mingazova; Kazakhstan	Yuliati; Indonesia	Lien Pei-ju; Chinese Taipei
Lightweight −57 kg	Chie Iwata; Japan	Alina Ten; Kazakhstan	Chipchinda Bonhphaaksone; Laos
Lightweight −57 kg	Chie Iwata; Japan	Alina Ten; Kazakhstan	L. Nirupama Devi; India
Half middleweight −63 kg	Rina Kozawa; Japan	Iroda Abdurahmanova; Uzbekistan	Julaluk Yea-on; Thailand
Half middleweight −63 kg	Rina Kozawa; Japan	Iroda Abdurahmanova; Uzbekistan	Garima Chaudhary; India
Middleweight −70 kg	Albina Amangeldiyeva; Kazakhstan	Hwang Ye-sul; South Korea	Han I-pin; Chinese Taipei
Middleweight −70 kg	Albina Amangeldiyeva; Kazakhstan	Hwang Ye-sul; South Korea	Karen Soloman; Philippines
Half heavyweight −78 kg	Jeong Gyeong-mi; South Korea	Arreewan Chansri; Thailand	None awarded
Half heavyweight −78 kg	Jeong Gyeong-mi; South Korea	Arreewan Chansri; Thailand	None awarded
Heavyweight +78 kg	Kanae Yamabe; Japan	Kim Na-young; South Korea	Niramon Protaeng; Thailand
Heavyweight +78 kg	Kanae Yamabe; Japan	Kim Na-young; South Korea	Mariya Shekerova; Uzbekistan

== Medal table ==
Rank	Nation	Gold	Silver	Bronze	Total
1	South Korea (KOR)	5	2	1	8
2	Japan (JPN)	5	1	1	7
3	Kazakhstan (KAZ)	3	2	1	6
4	Indonesia (INA)	1	1	0	2
5	Thailand (THA)	0	2	3	5
6	Mongolia (MGL)	0	2	0	2
7	Chinese Taipei (TPE)	0	1	5	6
7	India (IND)	0	1	5	6
9	Uzbekistan (UZB)	0	1	3	4
10	Vietnam (VIE)	0	1	1	2
11	Laos (LAO)	0	0	2	2
12	Bahrain (BRN)	0	0	1	1
12	Kuwait (KUW)	0	0	1	1
12	Philippines (PHI)	0	0	1	1
12	Qatar (QAT)	0	0	1	1
Totals (15 entries)		14	14	26	54

== Results ==
=== Men ===
==== 60 kg ====
2 August

Preliminary 1/16
	Score	
Daisuke Asano (JPN)	022–000	Ahmad Al-Dheyabi (KUW)

Preliminary 1/8
Mustafa Khousrof (YEM)	001
Zafar Iqbal (PAK)	010
Saroj Maharjan (NEP)	000
Kim Ki-yong (KOR)	100
Saman Dinesh Kumara (SRI)	010
Ittipong Thanaphon (THA)	011
Daisuke Asano (JPN)	101
Chittakone Sivanvilay (LAO)	000
Hồ Ngân Giang (VIE)	100
Chan Yat Hei (HKG)	000
Navjot Chana (IND)	000
Davaadorjiin Tömörkhüleg (MGL)	111
Fadi Darwish (SYR)	000
Timur Omonov (UZB)	100
Kanat Baimbetov (KAZ)
Bye

Quarterfinals
Zafar Iqbal (PAK)	000
Kim Ki-yong (KOR)	100
Ittipong Thanaphon (THA)	000
Daisuke Asano (JPN)	100
Hồ Ngân Giang (VIE)	000
Davaadorjiin Tömörkhüleg (MGL)	021
Timur Omonov (UZB)	001
Kanat Baimbetov (KAZ)	002

Semifinals
Kim Ki-yong (KOR)	000
Daisuke Asano (JPN)	100
Davaadorjiin Tömörkhüleg (MGL)	001
Kanat Baimbetov (KAZ)	000

Final
Daisuke Asano (JPN)	100
Davaadorjiin Tömörkhüleg (MGL)	000

Repechage 1
Zafar Iqbal (PAK)	000
Ittipong Thanaphon (THA)	100
Hồ Ngân Giang (VIE)	001
Timur Omonov (UZB)	100

Repechage final
Ittipong Thanaphon (THA)	000
Kanat Baimbetov (KAZ)	100
Timur Omonov (UZB)	000
Kim Ki-yong (KOR)	100

==== 66 kg ====
2 August

Preliminary 1/8
Peter Taslim (INA)	020
Olot Sasengbong (LAO)	001
Dennis Catipon (PHI)	000
Mansour Al-Shaleh (SYR)	101
Yuki Hayano (JPN)	002
Ulugbek Norkobilov (UZB)	001
Dölgööny Davaasüren (MGL)	102
Ajmal Faiz Zada (AFG)	000
Chui Yiu Leung (HKG)	000
Ho Yu-chieh (TPE)	100
Ramesh Magar (NEP)	000
Manavit Somboon (THA)	100

Quarterfinals
Nguyễn Quốc Hùng (VIE)	100
Peter Taslim (INA)	000
Mansour Al-Shaleh (SYR)	000
Yuki Hayano (JPN)	011
Chandana Jayantha Bandara (SRI)	000
Dölgööny Davaasüren (MGL)	100
Ho Yu-chieh (TPE)	001
Manavit Somboon (THA)	000

Semifinals
Nguyễn Quốc Hùng (VIE)	000
Yuki Hayano (JPN)	101
Dölgööny Davaasüren (MGL)	100
Ho Yu-chieh (TPE)	000

Final
Yuki Hayano (JPN)	001
Dölgööny Davaasüren (MGL)	000

Repechage 1
Peter Taslim (INA)	000
Mansour Al-Shaleh (SYR)	110
Chandana Jayantha Bandara (SRI)	000
Manavit Somboon (THA)	022

Repechage final
Mansour Al-Shaleh (SYR)	000
Ho Yu-chieh (TPE)	021
Manavit Somboon (THA)	000
Nguyễn Quốc Hùng (VIE)	101

==== 73 kg ====
2 August

Preliminary 1/8
Karamat Butt (PAK)	100
Sayed Hussain Hussaini (AFG)	000
Jimmy Anggoro (INA)	000
Ramashrey Yadav (IND)	100

Quarterfinals
Karamat Butt (PAK)	000
Bang Gui-man (KOR)	100
Shinji Kanaoka (JPN)	021
Ramashrey Yadav (IND)	000
Cheung Chi Yip (HKG)	000
Huang Chun-ta (TPE)	100
Rahim Berkeliýew (TKM)	101
Oudai Al-Mawirdi (SYR)	000

Semifinals
Bang Gui-man (KOR)	100
Shinji Kanaoka (JPN)	000
Huang Chun-ta (TPE)	023
Rahim Berkeliýew (TKM)	000

Final
Bang Gui-man (KOR)	100
Huang Chun-ta (TPE)	000

Repechage 1
Karamat Butt (PAK)	000
Ramashrey Yadav (IND)	100
Cheung Chi Yip (HKG)	000
Oudai Al-Mawirdi (SYR)	011

Repechage final
Ramashrey Yadav (IND)	100
Rahim Berkeliýew (TKM)	000
Oudai Al-Mawirdi (SYR)	000
Shinji Kanaoka (JPN)	100

==== 81 kg ====
2 August

Preliminary 1/8
Muhammad Mehraj (PAK)	000
Meshal Sheaibi (KUW)	100
Waleed Hanafi (QAT)	100
Susantha Kumara (SRI)	000
John Baylon (PHI)	001
Johanes Taslim (INA)	000
Song Dae-nam (KOR)	020
Otgonbaataryn Uuganbaatar (MGL)	000

Quarterfinals
Meshal Sheaibi (KUW)	000
Duman Aldiyev (KAZ)	100
Virender Singh (IND)	000
Waleed Hanafi (QAT)	100
Wu Chen-ying (TPE)	100
John Baylon (PHI)	000
Ip Chi On (MAC)	000
Song Dae-nam (KOR)	100

Semifinals
Duman Aldiyev (KAZ)	012
Waleed Hanafi (QAT)	000
Wu Chen-ying (TPE)	000
Song Dae-nam (KOR)	100

Final
Duman Aldiyev (KAZ)	000
Song Dae-nam (KOR)	101

Repechage 1
Meshal Sheaibi (KUW)	000
Virender Singh (IND)	001
John Baylon (PHI)	100
Ip Chi On (MAC)	000

Repechage final
Virender Singh (IND)	000
Wu Chen-ying (TPE)	001
John Baylon (PHI)	001
Waleed Hanafi (QAT)	002

==== 90 kg ====
3 August

Preliminary 1/8
Mohammad Al-Saleh (SYR)	000
Khurshid Nabiev (UZB)	020
Ghanam Al-Dikan (KUW)	100
Najibullah Omar Khil (AFG)	000
Bayarsaikhany Ambaselmaa (MGL)	101
Awad Naemi (QAT)	000

Quarterfinals
Khurshid Nabiev (UZB)	000
Ghanam Al-Dikan (KUW)	100
Shun Saito (JPN)	100
Chiang Cheng-an (TPE)	000
Kalu Man Tamang (NEP)
Bye
Kwon Young-woo (KOR)	100
Bayarsaikhany Ambaselmaa (MGL)	000

Semifinals
Ghanam Al-Dikan (KUW)	000
Shun Saito (JPN)	101
Kalu Man Tamang (NEP)	000
Kwon Young-woo (KOR)	100

Final
Shun Saito (JPN)	001
Kwon Young-woo (KOR)	011

Repechage 1
Khurshid Nabiev (UZB)	111
Chiang Cheng-an (TPE)	000
Bye
Bayarsaikhany Ambaselmaa (MGL)

Repechage final
Khurshid Nabiev (UZB)	100
Kalu Man Tamang (NEP)	000
Bayarsaikhany Ambaselmaa (MGL)	000
Ghanam Al-Dikan (KUW)	100

==== 100 kg ====
3 August

Quarterfinals
Krisna Bayu (INA)	101
Mohammad Tawfiq Bakhshi (AFG)	000
Khaled Al-Araifi (BRN)	003
Atit Puangwichean (THA)	001
Anil Kumar (IND)	110
Chan Ion Peng (MAC)	000

Semifinals
Bye
Krisna Bayu (INA)
Khaled Al-Araifi (BRN)	000
Anil Kumar (IND)	100

Final
Krisna Bayu (INA)	001
Anil Kumar (IND)	000

Repechage 1
Atit Puangwichean (THA)	111
Chan Ion Peng (MAC)	000

Repechage final
Mohammad Tawfiq Bakhshi (AFG)	000
Khaled Al-Araifi (BRN)	100
Atit Puangwichean (THA)
Bye

==== +100 kg ====
3 August

Quarterfinals
Panupong Prothien (THA)	100
Fadhel Abbas Ghuloom (BRN)	000
Utkur Salyamov (UZB)	000
Yerzhan Shynkeyev (KAZ)	001

Semifinals
Panupong Prothien (THA)	100
Yousaf Riaz (PAK)	000
Yerzhan Shynkeyev (KAZ)	100
Sengsouly Manivong (LAO)	000

Final
Panupong Prothien (THA)	000
Yerzhan Shynkeyev (KAZ)	100

Repechage final
Fadhel Abbas Ghuloom (BRN)	000
Sengsouly Manivong (LAO)	100
Utkur Salyamov (UZB)	100
Yousaf Riaz (PAK)	000

=== Women ===
==== 48 kg ====
2 August

Preliminary 1/8
Hsieh Pei-ling (TPE)	110
Farah Al-Salem (KUW)	000
Phetnida Syamphone (LAO)	001
Tombi Devi (IND)	020
Kwanchanok Jathikawanich (THA)	000
Margarita Filippowa (TKM)	102

Quarterfinals
Văn Ngọc Tú (VIE)	110
Hsieh Pei-ling (TPE)	000
Leong Siu Pou (MAC)	000
Tombi Devi (IND)	001
Chung Jung-yeon (KOR)	101
Chamila Wijerathna (SRI)	000
Bye
Margarita Filippowa (TKM)

Semifinals
Văn Ngọc Tú (VIE)	100
Tombi Devi (IND)	000
Chung Jung-yeon (KOR)	021
Margarita Filippowa (TKM)	000

Final
Văn Ngọc Tú (VIE)	001
Chung Jung-yeon (KOR)	110

Repechage 1
Hsieh Pei-ling (TPE)	012
Leong Siu Pou (MAC)	000
Chamila Wijerathna (SRI)
Bye

Repechage final
Hsieh Pei-ling (TPE)	001
Margarita Filippowa (TKM)	000
Chamila Wijerathna (SRI)	000
Tombi Devi (IND)	100

==== 52 kg ====
2 August

Preliminary 1/8
Sushila Adhikari (NEP)	000
Atefa Hussaini (AFG)	011

Quarterfinals
Atefa Hussaini (AFG)	002
Phonenaly Sayarath (LAO)	100
Yuliati (INA)	020
Helen Dawa (PHI)	000
Humaira Ashiq (PAK)	000
Lenariya Mingazova (KAZ)	111
Lien Pei-ju (TPE)	000
Kalpana Devi Thoudam (IND)	001

Semifinals
Phonenaly Sayarath (LAO)	000
Yuliati (INA)	002
Lenariya Mingazova (KAZ)	100
Kalpana Devi Thoudam (IND)	000

Final
Yuliati (INA)	000
Lenariya Mingazova (KAZ)	100

Repechage 1
Atefa Hussaini (AFG)	000
Helen Dawa (PHI)	100
Humaira Ashiq (PAK)	000
Lien Pei-ju (TPE)	021

Repechage final
Helen Dawa (PHI)	000
Kalpana Devi Thoudam (IND)	010
Lien Pei-ju (TPE)	100
Phonenaly Sayarath (LAO)	000

==== 57 kg ====
2 August

Quarterfinals		Semifinals		Final
		Alina Ten (KAZ)	101
Chipchinda Bonhphaaksone (LAO)	000	L. Nirupama Devi (IND)	001
L. Nirupama Devi (IND)	101			Alina Ten (KAZ)	000
Chie Iwata (JPN)	101			Chie Iwata (JPN)	100
Ni Kadek Anny Pandini (INA)	000	Chie Iwata (JPN)	WO
		Elena Isakova (KGZ)

Repechage final
Chipchinda Bonhphaaksone (LAO)
Bye
Ni Kadek Anny Pandini (INA)	000
L. Nirupama Devi (IND)	003

==== 63 kg ====
2 August

Preliminary 1/8
Beenish Khan (PAK)	000
Jenielou Mosqueda (PHI)	100
Phonethip Sonetavan (LAO)	100
Yasmeen Al-Salem (KUW)	000

Quarterfinals
Jenielou Mosqueda (PHI)	000
Iroda Abdurahmanova (UZB)	110
Garima Chaudhary (IND)	010
Julaluk Yea-on (THA)	000
Phonethip Sonetavan (LAO)	000
Teni Anggraeni (INA)	100
Rina Kozawa (JPN)
Bye

Semifinals
Iroda Abdurahmanova (UZB)	021
Garima Chaudhary (IND)	000
Teni Anggraeni (INA)	000
Rina Kozawa (JPN)	100

Final
Iroda Abdurahmanova (UZB)	000
Rina Kozawa (JPN)	020

Repechage 1
Jenielou Mosqueda (PHI)	003
Julaluk Yea-on (THA)	020
Phonethip Sonetavan (LAO)
Bye

Repechage final
Julaluk Yea-on (THA)	011
Teni Anggraeni (INA)	001
Phonethip Sonetavan (LAO)	000
Garima Chaudhary (IND)	100

==== 70 kg ====
3 August

Quarterfinals
Han I-pin (TPE)	000
Indah Setiawati (INA)	110
Hwang Ye-sul (KOR)	101
Karen Soloman (PHI)	000

Semifinals
Albina Amangeldiyeva (KAZ)	100
Indah Setiawati (INA)	000
Chandimali Gunasekera (SRI)	000
Hwang Ye-sul (KOR)	110

Final
Albina Amangeldiyeva (KAZ)	010
Hwang Ye-sul (KOR)	002

Repechage final
Han I-pin (TPE)	100
Chandimali Gunasekera (SRI)	000
Karen Soloman (PHI)	101
Indah Setiawati (INA)	010

==== 78 kg ====
3 August

Final
Jeong Gyeong-mi (KOR)	100
Arreewan Chansri (THA)	000

==== +78 kg ====
3 August

Quarterfinals		Semifinals		Final
		Mariya Shekerova (UZB)	000
Niramon Protaeng (THA)	000	Kanae Yamabe (JPN)	100
Kanae Yamabe (JPN)	100			Kanae Yamabe (JPN)	110
				Kim Na-young (KOR)	001
		Tsai Hsiu-ya (TPE)	000
		Kim Na-young (KOR)	102

Repechage final
Niramon Protaeng (THA)	001
Tsai Hsiu-ya (TPE)	000
Bye
Mariya Shekerova (UZB)
