= Mohammad Al-Bakhit =

Jordanian Taekwondo practitioner

Medal record

Men's taekwondo

Representing Jordan

Asian Games
Gold medal – first place	2006 Doha	Finweight

Asian Martial Arts Games
Bronze medal – third place	2009 Bangkok	Finweight

Mohammad Al-Bakhit (born February 22, 1987) is a male Jordanian Taekwondo practitioner. He won the gold medal in the finweight category (-54 kg) at the 2006 Asian Games.

== Career ==
Al Bakhit at the 2002 World Junior Taekwondo Championships won the finweight gold medal. On December 7, 2006, he took the gold medal of taekwondo men's finweight (-54 kg), beating Vasavat Somswang from Thailand in the final of the 2006 Asian Games. That was the first gold medal of Jordan in the history of Asian Games.
