= Pencak silat at the 2009 Asian Martial Arts Games =

- Venue: Chaofah Mahachakree Sirinthorn Gymnasium
- Dates: 3–7 August 2009

The Pencak silat competition at the 2009 Asian Martial Arts Games took place from 3 August to 7 August at the Chaofah Mahachakree Sirinthorn Gymnasium at Sports School Suphan Buri Province in Suphan Buri.

== Medalists ==
=== Men ===
Event	Gold	Silver	Bronze
Class A 45–50 kg	Niphon Jantaro; Thailand	Amirul Ahat; Brunei	Okhe Bodsavang; Laos
Class A 45–50 kg	Niphon Jantaro; Thailand	Amirul Ahat; Brunei	None awarded
Class B 50–55 kg	Lulfan Budi Santoso; Indonesia	Jul-Omar Abdulhakim; Philippines	Trần Văn Toàn; Vietnam
Class B 50–55 kg	Lulfan Budi Santoso; Indonesia	Jul-Omar Abdulhakim; Philippines	Jamoliddin Salimjonov; Uzbekistan
Class C 55–60 kg	Pujo Janoko; Indonesia	Prasit Warlam; Thailand	Olanh Sihalath; Laos
Class C 55–60 kg	Pujo Janoko; Indonesia	Prasit Warlam; Thailand	Islahidayat Ismail; Malaysia
Class D 60–65 kg	Chaiwat Nimma; Thailand	Ahmad Shahril Zailudin; Malaysia	Khuzaiman Ahmad; Brunei
Class D 60–65 kg	Chaiwat Nimma; Thailand	Ahmad Shahril Zailudin; Malaysia	Bakhtiyor Norov; Uzbekistan
Class E 65–70 kg	Komang Wahyu; Indonesia	Muhammad Shafiq; Singapore	Sinhkhone Xayaphomma; Laos
Class E 65–70 kg	Komang Wahyu; Indonesia	Muhammad Shafiq; Singapore	Joemil Solomon; Philippines
Class F 70–75 kg	Trương Văn Mạo; Vietnam	Elyasak Said; Singapore	Fauzi Khalid; Malaysia
Class F 70–75 kg	Trương Văn Mạo; Vietnam	Elyasak Said; Singapore	Khairul Bahri Ali Umar; Brunei

=== Women ===
Event	Gold	Silver	Bronze
Class A 45–50 kg	Lê Thị Phi Nga; Vietnam	Pengki Simbar; Indonesia	Boutsady Soudavong; Laos
Class A 45–50 kg	Lê Thị Phi Nga; Vietnam	Pengki Simbar; Indonesia	None awarded
Class B 50–55 kg	Huỳnh Thị Thu Hồng; Vietnam	Noor Farhana Ismail; Malaysia	Jitarat Noytapa; Thailand
Class B 50–55 kg	Huỳnh Thị Thu Hồng; Vietnam	Noor Farhana Ismail; Malaysia	Bounmy Sisombath; Laos
Class C 55–60 kg	Emy Latip; Malaysia	Jongdee Hemkaeo; Thailand	Saiedah Said; Singapore
Class C 55–60 kg	Emy Latip; Malaysia	Jongdee Hemkaeo; Thailand	None awarded
Class D 60–65 kg	Ni Nyoman Suparniti; Indonesia	Siti Rahmah Nasir; Malaysia	Marie Charilou Rabino; Philippines
Class D 60–65 kg	Ni Nyoman Suparniti; Indonesia	Siti Rahmah Nasir; Malaysia	Nur Zulaikha Zakaria; Singapore
Class E 65–70 kg	Lê Thị Hồng Ngoan; Vietnam	Puspa Endah Fitriani; Indonesia	None awarded
Class E 65–70 kg	Lê Thị Hồng Ngoan; Vietnam	Puspa Endah Fitriani; Indonesia	None awarded

== Medal table ==
Rank	Nation	Gold	Silver	Bronze	Total
1	Indonesia (INA)	4	2	0	6
2	Vietnam (VIE)	4	0	1	5
3	Thailand (THA)	2	2	1	5
4	Malaysia (MAS)	1	3	2	6
5	Singapore (SIN)	0	2	2	4
6	Brunei (BRU)	0	1	2	3
6	Philippines (PHI)	0	1	2	3
8	Laos (LAO)	0	0	5	5
9	Uzbekistan (UZB)	0	0	2	2
Totals (9 entries)		11	11	17	39

== Results ==
=== Men ===
==== 50 kg ====
Semifinals; 5 August		Final; 7 August
Niphon Jantaro (THA)	5
Okhe Bodsavang (LAO)	0	Niphon Jantaro (THA)	5
		Amirul Ahat (BRU)	0

==== 55 kg ====
Semifinals; 4 August		Final; 7 August
Lulfan Budi Santoso (INA)	4
Trần Văn Toàn (VIE)	1	Lulfan Budi Santoso (INA)	5
Jamoliddin Salimjonov (UZB)	0	Jul-Omar Abdulhakim (PHI)	0
Jul-Omar Abdulhakim (PHI)	5

==== 60 kg ====
Quarterfinals; 3–4 August
Olanh Sihalath (LAO)	WO
Shakir Juanda (SIN)
Nguyễn Bá Trình (VIE)	1
Islahidayat Ismail (MAS)	4

Semifinals; 5 August
Olanh Sihalath (LAO)	0
Prasit Warlam (THA)	5
Islahidayat Ismail (MAS)	1
Pujo Janoko (INA)	4

Final; 7 August
Prasit Warlam (THA)	2
Pujo Janoko (INA)	3

==== 65 kg ====
Semifinals; 4 August		Final; 7 August
Khuzaiman Ahmad (BRU)	0
Chaiwat Nimma (THA)	5	Chaiwat Nimma (THA)	4
Bakhtiyor Norov (UZB)	0	Ahmad Shahril Zailudin (MAS)	1
Ahmad Shahril Zailudin (MAS)	5

==== 70 kg ====
Semifinals; 4 August		Final; 7 August
Sinhkhone Xayaphomma (LAO)	2
Muhammad Shafiq (SIN)	3	Muhammad Shafiq (SIN)	0
Joemil Solomon (PHI)	0	Komang Wahyu (INA)	5
Komang Wahyu (INA)	5

==== 75 kg ====
Semifinals; 4–5 August		Final; 7 August
Trương Văn Mạo (VIE)	3
Fauzi Khalid (MAS)	2	Trương Văn Mạo (VIE)	4
Elyasak Said (SIN)	3	Elyasak Said (SIN)	1
Khairul Bahri Ali Umar (BRU)	2

=== Women ===
==== 50 kg ====
Semifinals; 5 August		Final; 7 August
Lê Thị Phi Nga (VIE)	5
Boutsady Soudavong (LAO)	0	Lê Thị Phi Nga (VIE)	4
		Pengki Simbar (INA)	1

==== 55 kg ====
Quarterfinals; 3 August
Nur Dinniyati Julaimi (SIN)	0
Huỳnh Thị Thu Hồng (VIE)	5

Semifinals; 4–5 August
Huỳnh Thị Thu Hồng (VIE)	5
Jitarat Noytapa (THA)	0
Bounmy Sisombath (LAO)	0
Noor Farhana Ismail (MAS)	5

Final; 7 August
Huỳnh Thị Thu Hồng (VIE)	5
Noor Farhana Ismail (MAS)	0

==== 60 kg ====
Semifinals; 5 August		Final; 7 August
Saiedah Said (SIN)	1
Jongdee Hemkaeo (THA)	4	Jongdee Hemkaeo (THA)	1
		Emy Latip (MAS)	4

==== 65 kg ====
Quarterfinals; 3 August
Monruthai Bansalap (THA)	0
Ni Nyoman Suparniti (INA)	5

Semifinals; 5 August
Ni Nyoman Suparniti (INA)	5
Marie Charilou Rabino (PHI)	0
Nur Zulaikha Zakaria (SIN)
Siti Rahmah Nasir (MAS)	WO

Final; 7 August
Ni Nyoman Suparniti (INA)	5
Siti Rahmah Nasir (MAS)	0

==== 70 kg ====
Final; 7 August
Puspa Endah Fitriani (INA)	1
Lê Thị Hồng Ngoan (VIE)	4
