= Abdulrahim Abdulhameed =

Bahraini Taekwondo practitioner (born 1990)

Medal record

Representing Bahrain

Men's taekwondo

Asian Games
Bronze medal – third place	2006 Doha	Finweight

Asian Martial Arts Games
Gold medal – first place	2009 Bangkok	Finweight

Abdulrahim Abdulhameed (born March 31, 1990) is a male Bahraini Taekwondo practitioner.

At the 2010 Asian Games, Abdulrahim was a win away from securing at least a bronze medal, but with about a minute into his quarterfinal bout against Kim Seong-Ho of South Korea, he began to feel dazed and short of breath while experiencing unbearable pain in his abdomen. He even had trouble standing up by himself, and needed to be stretchered off the playing court and into an ambulance to be rushed to a local hospital. Abdulrahim underwent successful laparoscopic surgery next day to remove some blood that had collected in his abdomen which was causing him severe pain while competing at the Asian Games.
