= Kurash at the 2009 Asian Martial Arts Games =

- Venue: Thai-Japanese Youth Center
- Dates: 6–8 August 2009

The Kurash competition at the 2009 Asian Martial Arts Games took place from 6 August to 8 August at the Thai-Japan Youth Center.

== Medalists ==
=== Men ===
Event	Gold	Silver	Bronze
−60 kg	Sarawut Petsing; Thailand	Abdul Wahed Wahedi; Afghanistan	Ganbaataryn Gonchigsumlaa; Mongolia
−60 kg	Sarawut Petsing; Thailand	Abdul Wahed Wahedi; Afghanistan	Uktam Ergashev; Uzbekistan
−66 kg	Olim Ravshanov; Uzbekistan	Hsu Peng-yao; Chinese Taipei	Batkhuyagiin Erkhbayar; Mongolia
−66 kg	Olim Ravshanov; Uzbekistan	Hsu Peng-yao; Chinese Taipei	Fadi Darwish; Syria
−73 kg	Ramazan Mustafayev; Kazakhstan	Nguyễn Tuấn Học; Vietnam	Praveen Thakur; India
−73 kg	Ramazan Mustafayev; Kazakhstan	Nguyễn Tuấn Học; Vietnam	Siaf Khedher; Iraq
−81 kg	Chen Fu-chen; Chinese Taipei	Krishan Kumar; India	Oudai Al-Mawirdi; Syria
−81 kg	Chen Fu-chen; Chinese Taipei	Krishan Kumar; India	None awarded
−90 kg	Sherali Juraev; Uzbekistan	Ruslan Abdrazakov; Kazakhstan	Chang Chieh-hsiang; Chinese Taipei
−90 kg	Sherali Juraev; Uzbekistan	Ruslan Abdrazakov; Kazakhstan	Najibullah Omarkhil; Afghanistan
−100 kg	Ekramuddin Ahmadi; Afghanistan	Kitsana Julapho; Thailand	Ali Abdul-Hussein; Iraq
−100 kg	Ekramuddin Ahmadi; Afghanistan	Kitsana Julapho; Thailand	Manish Kumar; India
+100 kg	Beibut Istybayev; Kazakhstan	Ikrom Nurullaev; Uzbekistan	Liu I-wen; Chinese Taipei
+100 kg	Beibut Istybayev; Kazakhstan	Ikrom Nurullaev; Uzbekistan	Likhit Ritthisak; Thailand

=== Women ===
Event	Gold	Silver	Bronze
−48 kg	Mukaddas Kubeyeva; Uzbekistan	Ornareeya Konngoen; Thailand	Yu Ying-ying; Chinese Taipei
−48 kg	Mukaddas Kubeyeva; Uzbekistan	Ornareeya Konngoen; Thailand	Phan Thu Phương; Vietnam
−52 kg	Shally Manral; India	Anchali Kanyayon; Thailand	None awarded
−52 kg	Shally Manral; India	Anchali Kanyayon; Thailand	None awarded
−57 kg	Ochirpüreviin Lkhagvakhüü; Mongolia	Nguyễn Thị Lan; Vietnam	Aina Zharmanova; Kazakhstan
−57 kg	Ochirpüreviin Lkhagvakhüü; Mongolia	Nguyễn Thị Lan; Vietnam	Huang Shih-han; Chinese Taipei
−63 kg	Meruert Zhakisheva; Kazakhstan	Nguyễn Thị Hương; Vietnam	Nayana Bhal Paul; India
−63 kg	Meruert Zhakisheva; Kazakhstan	Nguyễn Thị Hương; Vietnam	Du Yu-ling; Chinese Taipei
−70 kg	Kalshan Tayjanova; Kazakhstan	Cheng Yi-chen; Chinese Taipei	Gulmira Ismatova; Uzbekistan
−70 kg	Kalshan Tayjanova; Kazakhstan	Cheng Yi-chen; Chinese Taipei	None awarded
−78 kg	Jaya Chaudhary; India	Chumerin Pongsumang; Thailand	None awarded
−78 kg	Jaya Chaudhary; India	Chumerin Pongsumang; Thailand	None awarded
+78 kg	Şirin Kubaýewa; Turkmenistan	Kessinee Thongngok; Thailand	Anar Seitimova; Kazakhstan
+78 kg	Şirin Kubaýewa; Turkmenistan	Kessinee Thongngok; Thailand	None awarded

== Medal table ==
Rank	Nation	Gold	Silver	Bronze	Total
1	Kazakhstan (KAZ)	4	1	2	7
2	Uzbekistan (UZB)	3	1	2	6
3	India (IND)	2	1	3	6
4	Thailand (THA)	1	5	1	7
5	Chinese Taipei (TPE)	1	2	5	8
6	Afghanistan (AFG)	1	1	1	3
7	Mongolia (MGL)	1	0	2	3
8	Turkmenistan (TKM)	1	0	0	1
9	Vietnam (VIE)	0	3	1	4
10	Iraq (IRQ)	0	0	2	2
10	Syria (SYR)	0	0	2	2
Totals (11 entries)		14	14	21	49

== Results ==
=== Men ===
==== 60 kg ====
8 August

Quarterfinals
Ganbaataryn Gonchigsumlaa (MGL)	WO
Shariful Islam (BAN)
Sarawut Petsing (THA)	100
Uktam Ergashev (UZB)	000

Semifinals
Ganbaataryn Gonchigsumlaa (MGL)	000
Abdul Wahed Wahedi (AFG)	120
Sarawut Petsing (THA)
Bye

Final
Abdul Wahed Wahedi (AFG)	001
Sarawut Petsing (THA)	100

==== 66 kg ====
8 August

Qualification
Elyas Aminyar (AFG)	001
Hsu Peng-yao (TPE)	121

Quarterfinals
Hsu Peng-yao (TPE)	003
Thitti Lekmechai (THA)	002
Batkhuyagiin Erkhbayar (MGL)	WO
Sheikh Amin (BAN)
Olim Ravshanov (UZB)	100
Myrat Kurbanow (TKM)	000
Fadi Darwish (SYR)	012
Navdeep Chana (IND)	001

Semifinals
Hsu Peng-yao (TPE)	001
Batkhuyagiin Erkhbayar (MGL)	001
Olim Ravshanov (UZB)	011
Fadi Darwish (SYR)	001

Final
Hsu Peng-yao (TPE)	000
Olim Ravshanov (UZB)	100

==== 73 kg ====
8 August

Quarterfinals
Ramazan Mustafayev (KAZ)	011
Mansour Al-Shaleh (SYR)	004
Mönkhbatyn Dagvadorj (MGL)	001
Nguyễn Tuấn Học (VIE)	101

Semifinals
Ramazan Mustafayev (KAZ)	110
Praveen Thakur (IND)	000
Nguyễn Tuấn Học (VIE)	113
Siaf Khedher (IRQ)	000

Final
Ramazan Mustafayev (KAZ)	112
Nguyễn Tuấn Học (VIE)	012

==== 81 kg ====
7 August

Semifinals		Final
Chen Fu-chen (TPE)	100
Oudai Al-Mawirdi (SYR)	000	Chen Fu-chen (TPE)	113
Krishan Kumar (IND)	WO	Krishan Kumar (IND)	000
Murtadha Kamal (IRQ)

==== 90 kg ====
7 August

Quarterfinals
Sherali Juraev (UZB)	121
Mohamad Ali Al-Saleh (SYR)	001
Ruslan Abdrazakov (KAZ)	101
Najibullah Omarkhil (AFG)	001

Semifinals
Sherali Juraev (UZB)	111
Chang Chieh-hsiang (TPE)	000
Ruslan Abdrazakov (KAZ)
Bye

Final
Sherali Juraev (UZB)	111
Ruslan Abdrazakov (KAZ)	000

==== 100 kg ====
6 August

Semifinals		Final
Ali Abdul-Hussein (IRQ)	000
Ekramuddin Ahmadi (AFG)	102	Ekramuddin Ahmadi (AFG)	101
Kitsana Julapho (THA)	101	Kitsana Julapho (THA)	000
Manish Kumar (IND)	000

==== +100 kg ====
6 August

Semifinals		Final
Liu I-wen (TPE)	000
Beibut Istybayev (KAZ)	100	Beibut Istybayev (KAZ)	001
Ikrom Nurullaev (UZB)	100	Ikrom Nurullaev (UZB)	000
Likhit Ritthisak (THA)	000

=== Women ===
==== 48 kg ====
6 August

Semifinals		Final
Ornareeya Konngoen (THA)	100
Yu Ying-ying (TPE)	000	Ornareeya Konngoen (THA)	000
Phan Thu Phương (VIE)	000	Mukaddas Kubeyeva (UZB)	101
Mukaddas Kubeyeva (UZB)	100

==== 52 kg ====
6 August

Semifinals		Final
Shally Manral (IND)	022
Anchali Kanyayon (THA)	004	Shally Manral (IND)	WO
		Sharmin Sultana (BAN)

==== 57 kg ====
7 August

Semifinals		Final
Nguyễn Thị Lan (VIE)	101
Aina Zharmanova (KAZ)	010	Nguyễn Thị Lan (VIE)	000
Ochirpüreviin Lkhagvakhüü (MGL)	013	Ochirpüreviin Lkhagvakhüü (MGL)	120
Huang Shih-han (TPE)	010

==== 63 kg ====
7 August

Semifinals		Final
Meruert Zhakisheva (KAZ)	011
Nayana Bhal Paul (IND)	001	Meruert Zhakisheva (KAZ)	003
Du Yu-ling (TPE)	001	Nguyễn Thị Hương (VIE)	001
Nguyễn Thị Hương (VIE)	010

==== 70 kg ====
7 August

Semifinals		Final
		Cheng Yi-chen (TPE)	000
Kalshan Tayjanova (KAZ)	102	Kalshan Tayjanova (KAZ)	101
Gulmira Ismatova (UZB)	000

==== 78 kg ====
8 August

Final
Chumerin Pongsumang (THA)	001
Jaya Chaudhary (IND)	002

==== +78 kg ====
8 August

Semifinals		Final
		Kessinee Thongngok (THA)	000
Anar Seitimova (KAZ)	002	Şirin Kubaýewa (TKM)	102
Şirin Kubaýewa (TKM)	010
