= Ju-jitsu at the 2009 Asian Martial Arts Games =

- Venue: Thai-Japanese Youth Center
- Dates: 4–6 August 2009

The Ju-Jitsu competition at the 2009 Asian Martial Arts Games took place from August 4 to August 6 at the Thai-Japan Youth Center.

== Medalists ==
=== Duo ===
Event	Gold	Silver	Bronze
Women	Pakistan; Shabina Nawaz Janjua; Farah Riaz	Thailand; Saowanee Limpanayingyong; Wassanaporn Samthong	India; Sakshi Singh; Gule Surkhab
Women	Pakistan; Shabina Nawaz Janjua; Farah Riaz	Thailand; Saowanee Limpanayingyong; Wassanaporn Samthong	None awarded
Mixed	Pakistan; Haroon Shakir Siddiqui; Shabina Nawaz Janjua	Thailand; Bodin Panjabutra; Saowanee Limpanayingyong	India; Lalit Singh; Sakshi Singh
Mixed	Pakistan; Haroon Shakir Siddiqui; Shabina Nawaz Janjua	Thailand; Bodin Panjabutra; Saowanee Limpanayingyong	None awarded

=== Fighting ===
Event	Gold	Silver	Bronze
Men's −69 kg	Aiat Ullah; Pakistan	Lalit Singh; India	Komrid Hanbenjapong; Thailand
Men's −69 kg	Aiat Ullah; Pakistan	Lalit Singh; India	Ramish Rahi; Afghanistan
Men's −77 kg	Bodin Panjabutra; Thailand	Siaf Khedher; Iraq	Din Mohummad Mubariz; Afghanistan
Men's −77 kg	Bodin Panjabutra; Thailand	Siaf Khedher; Iraq	Haroon Shakir Siddiqui; Pakistan
Men's −85 kg	Murtadha Kamal; Iraq	Elyorbek Akbarov; Uzbekistan	Muhammad Ashiq Mahmood; Pakistan
Men's −85 kg	Murtadha Kamal; Iraq	Elyorbek Akbarov; Uzbekistan	Kreangkrai Suwannachat; Thailand
Women's −55 kg	Wassanaporn Samthong; Thailand	Farah Riaz; Pakistan	Sakshi Singh; India
Women's −55 kg	Wassanaporn Samthong; Thailand	Farah Riaz; Pakistan	None awarded
Women's −62 kg	Saowanee Limpanayingyong; Thailand	Shabina Nawaz Janjua; Pakistan	Gule Surkhab; India
Women's −62 kg	Saowanee Limpanayingyong; Thailand	Shabina Nawaz Janjua; Pakistan	None awarded

== Medal table ==
Rank	Nation	Gold	Silver	Bronze	Total
1	Pakistan (PAK)	3	2	2	7
1	Thailand (THA)	3	2	2	7
3	Iraq (IRQ)	1	1	0	2
4	India (IND)	0	1	4	5
5	Uzbekistan (UZB)	0	1	0	1
6	Afghanistan (AFG)	0	0	2	2
Totals (6 entries)		7	7	10	24

== Results ==
=== Duo ===
==== Women ====
4 August

Round 1		Final
Saowanee Limpanayingyong (THA); Wassanaporn Samthong (THA)	80
Sakshi Singh (IND); Gule Surkhab (IND)	56	Saowanee Limpanayingyong (THA); Wassanaporn Samthong (THA)	79
		Shabina Nawaz Janjua (PAK); Farah Riaz (PAK)	83

==== Mixed ====
4 August

Round 1		Final
Bodin Panjabutra (THA); Saowanee Limpanayingyong (THA)	86
Lalit Singh (IND); Sakshi Singh (IND)	61	Bodin Panjabutra (THA); Saowanee Limpanayingyong (THA)	84
		Haroon Shakir Siddiqui (PAK); Shabina Nawaz Janjua (PAK)	85

=== Fighting ===
==== Men's 69 kg ====
5 August

Round 1		Semifinals		Final
				Lalit Singh (IND)	0
Komrid Hanbenjapong (THA)	14			Aiat Ullah (PAK)	14
Ramish Rahi (AFG)	2	Komrid Hanbenjapong (THA)	0
		Aiat Ullah (PAK)	14

==== Men's 77 kg ====
5 August

===== Knockout =====
Round 1
Din Mohummad Mubariz (AFG)	14–2	Abhay Kumar Mishra (IND)
Neda Al-Anezi (KUW)	0–14	Bodin Panjabutra (THA)
Siaf Khedher (IRQ)		Bye
Haroon Shakir Siddiqui (PAK)		Bye

===== Round robin =====
Pos	Athlete	Pld	W	L	THA	IRQ	AFG	PAK
1	Bodin Panjabutra (THA)	3	3	0	—	14–0	14–0	WO
2	Siaf Khedher (IRQ)	3	2	1	0–14	—	7–2	WO
3	Din Mohummad Mubariz (AFG)	3	1	2	0–14	2–7	—	WO
4	Haroon Shakir Siddiqui (PAK)	3	0	3				—

Source: Official website

==== Men's 85 kg ====
6 August

===== Knockout =====
Round 1
Murtadha Kamal (IRQ)	14–2	Mohammad Al-Bannai (KUW)
Kreangkrai Suwannachat (THA)	14–0	Tarsem Sharma (IND)
Elyorbek Akbarov (UZB)		Bye
Muhammad Ashiq Mahmood (PAK)		Bye

===== Round robin =====
Pos	Athlete	Pld	W	L	IRQ	UZB	PAK	THA
1	Murtadha Kamal (IRQ)	3	2	1	—	4–3	8–7	6–6^{(5–7)}
2	Elyorbek Akbarov (UZB)	3	2	1	3–4	—	13–3	10–5
3	Muhammad Ashiq Mahmood (PAK)	3	1	2	7–8	3–13	—	4–1
4	Kreangkrai Suwannachat (THA)	3	1	2	6–6^{(7–5)}	5–10	1–4	—

Source: Official website
- Murtadha Kamal of Iraq tied with Elyorbek Akbarov in score but defeated 7–5 the latter in final to seize the gold medal.

==== Women's 55 kg ====
5 August

Round 1		Final
Sakshi Singh (IND)	0
Farah Riaz (PAK)	14	Farah Riaz (PAK)	0
		Wassanaporn Samthong (THA)	14

==== Women's 62 kg ====
6 August

Round 1		Final
Gule Surkhab (IND)	0
Saowanee Limpanayingyong (THA)	14	Saowanee Limpanayingyong (THA)	14
		Shabina Nawaz Janjua (PAK)	0
