= Krisna Bayu =

Indonesian Olympic judoka (born 1974)

Personal information
- Full name: Krisna Bayu
- Nationality: Indonesia
- Born: 24 December 1974 (age 51) Semarang, Indonesia
- Height: 1.84 m (6 ft 1/2 in)
- Weight: 90 kg (198 lb)

Sport
- Sport: Judo
- Event: 90 kg
Medal record
Men's judo
Representing Indonesia
Asian Martial Arts Games
Gold medal – first place	2009 Bangkok	100 kg
Asian Championships
Bronze medal – third place	2004 Almaty	90 kg
SEA Games
Gold medal – first place	2001 Kuala Lumpur	100 kg
Bronze medal – third place	2011 Jakarta–Palembang	100 kg

Krisna Bayu (born December 24, 1974, in Jakarta) is an Indonesian judoka, who competed in the men's middleweight category. He won the gold medal in the 100-kg division at the 2001 SEA Games in Kuala Lumpur, Malaysia, picked up a bronze in the 90-kg at the 2004 Asian Judo Championships in Almaty, Kazakhstan, and represented his nation Indonesia in three editions of the Olympic Games (1996, 2000, and 2004).

Bayu made his official debut at the 1996 Summer Olympics in Atlanta, where he competed in the men's 86-kg class. He lost his opening match to Spain's León Villar, who successfully scored an ippon and duly wrapped him on the tatami with a side-quarter hold (yoko shiho gatame) at three minutes and fourteen seconds.

At the 2000 Summer Olympics in Sydney, Bayu crashed out early again in his opening match of the men's 90-kg division to Brazil's Carlos Honorato by an ippon and a vertical four-quarter hold (tate shiho gatame) with only fourteen seconds remaining. While his Brazilian opponent moving forward to the semifinal, Bayu gave himself a chance for the nation's first ever Olympic judo medal through the repechage, but saw it slipping away in his first playoff defeat to another Spaniard Fernando González, who subdued him on the mat in a corner reversal throw (sumi gaeshi) two minutes and twenty-one seconds into the match. The following year, Bayu reached the pinnacle of his sporting career upon capturing the gold medal in the 100-kg division at the SEA Games in Kuala Lumpur, Malaysia.

Eight years after his official Olympic debut, Bayu qualified for his third Indonesian squad, as a 29-year-old, in the men's middleweight class (90 kg) at the 2004 Summer Olympics in Athens, by placing third and receiving a berth from the Asian Championships in Almaty, Kazakhstan. Unlike his previous Olympic stint, Bayu denied his third chance of an Olympic medal, as he trailed behind Mongolia's Tsend-Ayuushiin Ochirbat by a 1–0 record on waza-ari at the end of their five-minute opening match. Bayu was also initially selected by the Indonesian Olympic Committee to supposedly carry the nation's flag in the opening ceremony, but decided to hand over his role to badminton coach Christian Hadinata.
