= South Korea at the 2009 Asian Martial Arts Games =

- IOC code: KOR
- NOC: Korean Olympic Committee

in Bangkok
- Medals Ranked 3rd: Gold 10 Silver 6 Bronze 3 Total 19

South Korea competed at the 2009 Asian Martial Arts Games held in Bangkok, Thailand from August 1, 2009 to August 9, 2009. South Korea finished with 10 gold medals, 6 silver medals, and 3 bronze medals.

== Medal summary ==
=== Medal table ===
| Sport | Gold | Silver | Bronze | Total |
|---|---|---|---|---|
| Judo | 5 | 2 | 1 | 8 |
| Taekwondo | 4 | 2 | 1 | 7 |
| Wushu | 1 | 1 | 1 | 3 |
| Karate | 0 | 1 | 0 | 1 |
| Totals (4 entries) | 10 | 6 | 3 | 19 |

=== Medalists ===
| Medal | Name | Sport | Event |
|---|---|---|---|
| Gold | Bang Gui-Man | Judo | Men's Lightweight (-73 kg) |
| Gold | Song Dae-Nam | Judo | Men's Half middleweight (-81 kg) |
| Gold | Kwon Young-Woo | Judo | Men's Middleweight (-90 kg) |
| Gold | Chung Jung-Yeon | Judo | Women's Extra lightweight (-48 kg) |
| Gold | Jeong Gyeong-Mi | Judo | Women's Half heavyweight (-78 kg) |
| Gold | Lee Gyu-Jin | Taekwondo | Men's Welterweight (-78 kg) |
| Gold | Hwang Dae-Sung | Taekwondo | Men's Middleweight (-84 kg) |
| Gold | Kim Min-Jung | Taekwondo | Women's Finweight (-47 kg) |
| Gold | Jang Eun-Suk | Taekwondo | Women's Flyweight (-51 kg) |
| Gold | Kim Jun-Yul | Wushu | Men's Sanshou 56 kg |
| Silver | Hwang Ye-Sul | Judo | Women's Middleweight (-70 kg) |
| Silver | Kim Na-Young | Judo | Women's Heavyweight (+78 kg) |
| Silver | Lee Ji-Hwan | Karate | Men's -60 kg |
| Silver | Kim Jae-Bong | Taekwondo | Men's Finweight (-54 kg) |
| Silver | Lee Woorinala | Taekwondo | Men's Flyweight (-58 kg) |
| Silver | Yu Hyeon-Seok | Wushu | Men's Sanshou 60 kg |
| Bronze | Kim Ki-Yong | Judo | Men's Extra lightweight (-60 kg) |
| Bronze | Oh Min-Ah | Taekwondo | Women's Heavyweight (+72 kg) |
| Silver | Kim A-Ri | Wushu | Women's Sanshou 48 kg |
