= Anil Kumar (judoka) =

Indian judoka

Anil Kumar (born 12 December 1984) is an Indian judoka.

== Achievements ==
Year	Competition	Venue	Position	Event	Notes
2004	Asian Judo Championships	Almaty, Kazakhstan	5th	Open class	
2005	Asian Judo Championships	Tashkent, Uzbekistan	7th	Middleweight (90 kg)	
2006	Asian Games	Doha, Qatar	10th	Middleweight (90 kg)	
2009	Asian Martial Arts Games	Bangkok, Thailand	2nd	Half heavyweight (−100 kg)	
