= Malaysia at the 2009 Asian Martial Arts Games =

- IOC code: MAS
- NOC: Olympic Council of Malaysia
- Website: www.olympic.org.my (in English)

in Bangkok
- Medals Ranked 14th: Gold 2 Silver 3 Bronze 3 Total 8

Malaysia participated in the 2009 Asian Martial Arts Games in Bangkok, Thailand from 1 to 8 August 2009. It won 2 gold, 3 silver and 3 bronze medals.

== Medallists ==
Medal	Name	Sport	Event	Date
Gold	Jamalliah Jamaluddin	Karate	Women's kumite +61 kg	7 August
Gold	Emy Latip	Pencak silat	Women's tanding 55-60 kg	7 August
Silver	Ahmad Shahril Zailudin	Pencak silat	Men's tanding 60-65 kg	7 August
Silver	Noor Farhana Ismail	Pencak silat	Women's tanding 50-55 kg	7 August
Silver	Siti Rahmah Mohd Nasir	Pencak silat	Women's tanding 60-65 kg	7 August
Bronze	Mohd Islahidayat Ismail	Pencak silat	Men's tanding 55-60 kg	5 August
Bronze	Mohd Fauzi Khalid	Pencak silat	Men's tanding 70-75 kg	5 August
Bronze	Mohd Hatta Mahamut	Karate	Men's kumite 84 kg	8 August
