= Japan at the 2009 Asian Martial Arts Games =

- IOC code: JPN
- NOC: Japanese Olympic Committee

in Bangkok
- Competitors: 19 in 4 sports
- Medals Ranked 5th: Gold 9 Silver 2 Bronze 3 Total 14

Asian Martial Arts Games appearances
- 2009

Japan participated in the 2009 Asian Martial Arts Games in Bangkok, Thailand on August 1–9, 2009. The nation finished fifth in the medal table after collected 9 gold, 2 silver, and 3 bronze medals.

== Medal table ==
Sport	Gold	Silver	Bronze	Total
Judo	5	1	1	7
Karate	4	1	1	6
Taekwondo	0	0	1	1
Totals (3 entries)	9	2	3	14

== Medalists ==
Medal	Name	Sport	Event	Date
Gold	Daisuke Asano	Judo	Men's extra lightweight, -60 kg	August 2
Gold	Yuki Hayano	Judo	Men's half lightweight, -66 kg	August 2
Gold	Chie Iwata	Judo	Women's lightweight, -57 kg	August 2
Gold	Rina Kozawa	Judo	Women's half middleweight, -63 kg	August 2
Gold	Kanae Yamabe	Judo	Women's heavyweight, +78 kg	August 3
Gold	Masahiko Ota	Karate	Men's -60 kg	August 6
Gold	Shinji Nagaki	Karate	Men's -67 kg	August 7
Gold	Ryosuke Shimizu	Karate	Men's -84 kg	August 8
Gold	Sayuri Maejima	Karate	Women's -61 kg	August 8
Silver	Shun Saito	Judo	Men's middleweight, -90 kg	August 3
Silver	Miki Kobayashi	Karate	Women's -55 kg	August 7
Bronze	Shinji Kanaoka	Judo	Men's lightweight, -73 kg	August 2
Bronze	Kenta Kai	Karate	Men's -75 kg	August 7
Bronze	Taisei Hojo	Taekwondo	Men's lightweight, -72 kg	August 5

== Competitors ==
The following is the list of number of competitors participating in the Games.

Sport	Men	Women	Total
Judo	4	3	7
Karate	4	2	6
Muaythai	2	0	2
Taekwondo	2	2	4
Total	12	7	19

== Judo ==
=== Men ===
Athlete	Event	Preliminary	Quarter-finals	Semi-finals	Repechage	Gold medal match	Rank
Daisuke Asano	-60 kg	(Laos) Sivanvilay; W	(Thailand) Thanaphon; W	(South Korea) Kim K Y W	Bye	(Mongolia) Tömörkhüleg; W	1st place, gold medalist(s)
Yuki Hayano	-66 kg	(Uzbekistan) Norkobilov; W	(Syria) Al Shaleh; W	(Vietnam) Nguyễn; W	Bye	(Mongolia) Davaasüren; W	1st place, gold medalist(s)
Shinji Kanaoka	-73 kg	Bye	(India) Yadav; W	(South Korea) Bang G M L	(Syria) Al Mawirdi; W	DNQ	3rd place, bronze medalist(s)
Shun Saito	-90 kg	Bye	(Chinese Taipei) Chiang C A W	(Kuwait) Al Dikan; W	Bye	(South Korea) Kwon Y W L	2nd place, silver medalist(s)

=== Women ===
Athlete	Event	Preliminary	Quarter-finals	Semi-finals	Repechage	Gold medal match	Rank
Chie Iwata	-57 kg	Bye	(Indonesia) Pandini; W	(Kyrgyzstan) Isakova; W	Bye	(Kazakhstan) Ten; W	1st place, gold medalist(s)
Rina Kozawa	-63 kg	Bye	Bye	(Indonesia) Anggraeni; W	Bye	(Uzbekistan) Abdurahmanova; W	1st place, gold medalist(s)
Kanae Yamabe	+78 kg	Bye	(Thailand) Protaeng; W	(Uzbekistan) Shekerova; W	Bye	(South Korea) Kim N Y W	1st place, gold medalist(s)

== Karate ==
=== Men ===
Athlete	Event	Preliminary	Quarter-finals	Semi-finals	Repechage	Gold medal match	Rank
Masahiko Ota	-60 kg	(Malaysia) Ramasamy; 3-2 W	(Laos) Xayakone; 8-1 W	(Kuwait) Hashim; 5-2 W	Bye	(South Korea) Lee J H 4-2 W	1st place, gold medalist(s)
Shinji Nagaki	-67 kg	(Syria) Othman; 1-0 W	(Afghanistan) Amiri; 3-0 W	(Jordan) Hadid; 3-1 W	Bye	(Vietnam) Nguyễn; 9-1 W	1st place, gold medalist(s)
Kenta Kai	-75 kg	(Vietnam) Nguyễn; 9-4 W	(Macau) Wong W K 8-4 W	(Syria) Al Hamwi; 4-6 L	(Chinese Taipei) Yen T Y 15-7 W	DNQ	3rd place, bronze medalist(s)
Ryosuke Shimizu	-84 kg	(Malaysia) Mahamut; 7-4 W	(South Korea) Jin M K 8-3 W	(Syria) Al Sabsabi; 10-2 W	Bye	(Indonesia) Salim; 4-1 W	1st place, gold medalist(s)

=== Women ===
Athlete	Event	Preliminary	Quarter-finals	Semi-finals	Repechage	Gold medal match	Rank
Miki Kobayashi	-55 kg	(South Korea) Jang S Y 7-3 W	(Nepal) Nagarkoti; 8-0 W	(Vietnam) Lưu; 9-3 W	Bye	(China) Chen D 2-3 L	2nd place, silver medalist(s)
Sayuri Maejima	-61 kg	(Philippines) Soriano; 5-0 W	(Laos) Phommachan; 8-0 W	(Vietnam) Bùi; 5-4 W	Bye	(Hong Kong) Chan K M 8-3 W	1st place, gold medalist(s)

== Muaythai ==
Athlete	Event	Preliminary	Quarter-finals	Semi-finals	Repechage	Gold medal match	Rank
Masayuki Uchida	57–60 kg	(India) Sahu; 5-0 W	(Uzbekistan) Kholmuratov; 0-5 L	DNQ			4
Kenta Miyagawa	60–63.5 kg	Bye	(China) Zhang X L 0-5 L	DNQ			4

== Taekwondo ==
=== Men ===
Athlete	Event	Preliminary	Quarter-finals	Semi-finals	Repechage	Gold medal match	Rank
Taisei Hojo	-72 kg	Bye	(Myanmar) Win T L 4-3 W	(Jordan) Talal; 2-5 L	DNQ		3rd place, bronze medalist(s)
Kenta Miyagawa	-78 kg	(Uzbekistan) Baykuziyev; 1-2 L	DNQ				5

=== Women ===
Athlete	Event	Preliminary	Quarter-finals	Semi-finals	Repechage	Gold medal match	Rank
Erika Kasahara	-51 kg	(Myanmar) Soe S M 4-0 W	(Thailand) Sangnarin; 4-5 L	DNQ			4
Honami Kobayashi	-55 kg	(Chinese Taipei) Kuan I W 3-8 L	DNQ				5
