= Muaythai at the 2009 Asian Martial Arts Games =

- Venue: Nimibutr Stadium
- Dates: 2–7 August 2009

The Muaythai competition at the 2009 Asian Martial Arts Games took place from 2 August to 7 August at the Nimibutr Stadium. There were seven women's events in original program but light welterweight event was cancelled due to lack of entries.

== Medalists ==
=== Men ===
Event	Gold	Silver	Bronze
Flyweight; 48–51 kg	Virapong Nonting; Thailand	Thongbang Seuaphom; Laos	Dolan Singh; India
Flyweight; 48–51 kg	Virapong Nonting; Thailand	Thongbang Seuaphom; Laos	Lê Hữu Phúc; Vietnam
Bantamweight; 51–54 kg	Sattra Paleenaram; Thailand	Noukhit Ladsaphao; Laos	Trần Văn Phương; Vietnam
Bantamweight; 51–54 kg	Sattra Paleenaram; Thailand	Noukhit Ladsaphao; Laos	Birzham Aukenov; Kazakhstan
Featherweight; 54–57 kg	Kittisak Boonsemsen; Thailand	Nguyễn Trần Duy Nhất; Vietnam	Souket Changdheow; Laos
Featherweight; 54–57 kg	Kittisak Boonsemsen; Thailand	Nguyễn Trần Duy Nhất; Vietnam	Sherzod Sharipov; Uzbekistan
Lightweight; 57–60 kg	Weerapol Kwangkhwang; Thailand	Zaidi Laruan; Philippines	Võ Văn Đài; Vietnam
Lightweight; 57–60 kg	Weerapol Kwangkhwang; Thailand	Zaidi Laruan; Philippines	Firdavsiy Kholmuratov; Uzbekistan
Light welterweight 60–63.5 kg	Sakdithat Sakdarat; Thailand	Zhang Xiaolong; China	Waleed Al-Jiousi; Jordan
Light welterweight 60–63.5 kg	Sakdithat Sakdarat; Thailand	Zhang Xiaolong; China	Roman Semerin; Kazakhstan
Welterweight; 63.5–67 kg	Mavlonbek Kahhorov; Uzbekistan	Sathit Keointa; Laos	Jay Harold Gregorio; Philippines
Welterweight; 63.5–67 kg	Mavlonbek Kahhorov; Uzbekistan	Sathit Keointa; Laos	Daulet Otarbayev; Kazakhstan
Light middleweight 67–71 kg	Almas Smagulov; Kazakhstan	Mustafa Farhan; Iraq	Rezwan Mohammadi; Afghanistan
Light middleweight 67–71 kg	Almas Smagulov; Kazakhstan	Mustafa Farhan; Iraq	Wang Guan; China
Middleweight; 71–75 kg	Damir Fatkhutdinov; Kazakhstan	Adel Jawad; Iraq	Balakrishna Shekhar Shetty; India
Middleweight; 71–75 kg	Damir Fatkhutdinov; Kazakhstan	Adel Jawad; Iraq	None awarded
Light heavyweight 75–81 kg	Mohammed Jabbar; Iraq	Nour Salman; Lebanon	Nawaf Ahmad; Kuwait
Light heavyweight 75–81 kg	Mohammed Jabbar; Iraq	Nour Salman; Lebanon	None awarded

=== Women ===
Event	Gold	Silver	Bronze
Pinweight; 42–45 kg	Phubthasone Keoxayyavong; Laos	Nguyễn Thị Mai Ngân; Vietnam	Mudrika; India
Pinweight; 42–45 kg	Phubthasone Keoxayyavong; Laos	Nguyễn Thị Mai Ngân; Vietnam	None awarded
Light flyweight 45–48 kg	Molthira Vatanapackdee; Thailand	Jenny So; Hong Kong	Sarita Devi Nongmaithem; India
Light flyweight 45–48 kg	Molthira Vatanapackdee; Thailand	Jenny So; Hong Kong	May Libao; Philippines
Flyweight; 48–51 kg	Kornnika Nuanboriboon; Thailand	Paylor Xaypao; Laos	Maricel Subang; Philippines
Flyweight; 48–51 kg	Kornnika Nuanboriboon; Thailand	Paylor Xaypao; Laos	Trần Thị Ngọc Lệ; Vietnam
Bantamweight; 51–54 kg	Prakaidao Pramari; Thailand	Liu Jia; China	Preciosa Ocaya; Philippines
Bantamweight; 51–54 kg	Prakaidao Pramari; Thailand	Liu Jia; China	Phan Thị Ngọc Linh; Vietnam
Featherweight; 54–57 kg	Sararat Kongsawang; Thailand	Chen Qing; China	Ana Maria Rey; Philippines
Featherweight; 54–57 kg	Sararat Kongsawang; Thailand	Chen Qing; China	Harbansh Kaur Sandhu; India
Lightweight; 57–60 kg	Diana Hamadeh; Lebanon	Trần Thị Hương; Vietnam	Mamta Verma; India
Lightweight; 57–60 kg	Diana Hamadeh; Lebanon	Trần Thị Hương; Vietnam	None awarded

== Medal table ==
Rank	Nation	Gold	Silver	Bronze	Total
1	Thailand (THA)	9	0	0	9
2	Kazakhstan (KAZ)	2	0	3	5
3	Laos (LAO)	1	4	1	6
4	Iraq (IRQ)	1	2	0	3
5	Lebanon (LIB)	1	1	0	2
6	Uzbekistan (UZB)	1	0	2	3
7	Vietnam (VIE)	0	3	5	8
8	China (CHN)	0	3	1	4
9	Philippines (PHI)	0	1	5	6
10	Hong Kong (HKG)	0	1	0	1
11	India (IND)	0	0	6	6
12	Afghanistan (AFG)	0	0	1	1
12	Jordan (JOR)	0	0	1	1
12	Kuwait (KUW)	0	0	1	1
Totals (14 entries)		15	15	26	56

== Results ==
=== Men ===
==== 51 kg ====
Quarterfinals; 2 August
Roland Claro (PHI)	0
Virapong Nonting (THA)	5
Ho Kwok Keung (HKG)	0
Thongbang Seuaphom (LAO)	5
Tserennadmidiin Batbold (MGL)	0
Lê Hữu Phúc (VIE)	5

Semifinals; 4 August
Dolan Singh (IND)
Virapong Nonting (THA)	RSCO
Thongbang Seuaphom (LAO)	RSCB
Lê Hữu Phúc (VIE)

Final; 7 August
Virapong Nonting (THA)	5
Thongbang Seuaphom (LAO)	0

==== 54 kg ====
Quarterfinals; 3 August
Tserennadmidiin Batbold (MGL)	0
Trần Văn Phương (VIE)	5
Noukhit Ladsaphao (LAO)	3
Saif Zakzook (JOR)	2
Sattra Paleenaram (THA)	5
Romnick Pabalate (PHI)	0
Birzham Aukenov (KAZ)	RSCO
Rishab Hirwani (IND)

Semifinals; 5 August
Trần Văn Phương (VIE)
Noukhit Ladsaphao (LAO)	RSCB
Sattra Paleenaram (THA)	5
Birzham Aukenov (KAZ)	0

Final; 7 August
Noukhit Ladsaphao (LAO)	0
Sattra Paleenaram (THA)	5

==== 57 kg ====
Quarterfinals; 2 August
Nguyễn Trần Duy Nhất (VIE)	4
Abdul Qayum Mohammadi (AFG)	1
Sajad Hussein (IRQ)	0
Sherzod Sharipov (UZB)	5

Semifinals; 5 August
Kittisak Boonsemsen (THA)	5
Souket Changdheow (LAO)	0
Nguyễn Trần Duy Nhất (VIE)	4
Sherzod Sharipov (UZB)	1

Final; 7 August
Kittisak Boonsemsen (THA)	5
Nguyễn Trần Duy Nhất (VIE)	0

==== 60 kg ====
1/8 round 2 August
Ali Saher (IRQ)	1
Wang Kang (CHN)	4
Nageshwar Sahu (IND)	0
Masayuki Uchida (JPN)	5
Kenneth Lee (HKG)	0
Firdavsiy Kholmuratov (UZB)	5

Quarterfinals; 4 August
Võ Văn Đài (VIE)	5
Erdenechuluuny Buyanbat (MGL)	0
Zaidi Laruan (PHI)	5
Saifullah Yaqubi (AFG)	0
Weerapol Kwangkhwang (THA)	5
Wang Kang (CHN)	0
Masayuki Uchida (JPN)	0
Firdavsiy Kholmuratov (UZB)	5

Semifinals; 5 August
Võ Văn Đài (VIE)	0
Zaidi Laruan (PHI)	5
Weerapol Kwangkhwang (THA)	5
Firdavsiy Kholmuratov (UZB)	0

Final; 7 August
Zaidi Laruan (PHI)	0
Weerapol Kwangkhwang (THA)	5

==== 63.5 kg ====
1/8 round 2 August
Azizbek Nazarov (UZB)	5
Otgonsürengiin Lkhasüren (MGL)	0

Quarterfinals; 3 August
Zhang Xiaolong (CHN)	5
Katsuji Takahashi (JPN)	0
Van Laleng Mawia (IND)	0
Waleed Al-Jiousi (JOR)	5
Roman Semerin (KAZ)	5
Jonathan Polosan (PHI)	0
Sakdithat Sakdarat (THA)	5
Azizbek Nazarov (UZB)	0

Semifinals; 5 August
Zhang Xiaolong (CHN)	RSCO
Waleed Al-Jiousi (JOR)
Roman Semerin (KAZ)	0
Sakdithat Sakdarat (THA)	5

Final; 7 August
Zhang Xiaolong (CHN)
Sakdithat Sakdarat (THA)	RSCI

==== 67 kg ====
Quarterfinals; 4 August
Jay Harold Gregorio (PHI)	5
Yaser Abusafiyah (JOR)	0
Kou Meng (MAC)
Sathit Keointa (LAO)	KO
Apto Go Sach (VIE)
Daulet Otarbayev (KAZ)	RSCB
Ali Sharif Taresh (KUW)
Mavlonbek Kahhorov (UZB)	RET

Semifinals; 5 August
Jay Harold Gregorio (PHI)	1
Sathit Keointa (LAO)	4
Daulet Otarbayev (KAZ)	0
Mavlonbek Kahhorov (UZB)	5

Final; 7 August
Sathit Keointa (LAO)	1
Mavlonbek Kahhorov (UZB)	4

==== 71 kg ====
Quarterfinals; 2 August
Almas Smagulov (KAZ)	5
Artur Kadirkulov (UZB)	0

Semifinals; 5 August
Rezwan Mohammadi (AFG)	0
Mustafa Farhan (IRQ)	5
Wang Guan (CHN)	1
Almas Smagulov (KAZ)	4

Final; 7 August
Mustafa Farhan (IRQ)
Almas Smagulov (KAZ)	RSCO

==== 75 kg ====
Semifinals; 3 August		Final; 7 August
		Damir Fatkhutdinov (KAZ)	5
Balakrishna Shekhar Shetty (IND)	0	Adel Jawad (IRQ)	0
Adel Jawad (IRQ)	5

==== 81 kg ====
Semifinals; 5 August		Final; 7 August
		Nour Salman (LIB)	0
Nawaf Ahmad (KUW)		Mohammed Jabbar (IRQ)	5
Mohammed Jabbar (IRQ)	RSCO

=== Women ===
==== 45 kg ====
Semifinals; 5 August		Final; 7 August
		Nguyễn Thị Mai Ngân (VIE)
Phubthasone Keoxayyavong (LAO)	5	Phubthasone Keoxayyavong (LAO)	RSCO
Mudrika (IND)	0

==== 48 kg ====
Quarterfinals; 3 August
Jenny So (HKG)	RSCI
Songkar Chantgavong (LAO)

Semifinals; 5 August
Sarita Devi Nongmaithem (IND)
Molthira Vatanapackdee (THA)	RSCO
May Libao (PHI)	0
Jenny So (HKG)	5

Final; 7 August
Molthira Vatanapackdee (THA)	5
Jenny So (HKG)	0

==== 51 kg ====
Semifinals; 2 August		Final; 7 August
Maricel Subang (PHI)	0
Paylor Xaypao (LAO)	5	Paylor Xaypao (LAO)	0
Kornnika Nuanboriboon (THA)	RSCO	Kornnika Nuanboriboon (THA)	5
Trần Thị Ngọc Lệ (VIE)

==== 54 kg ====
Semifinals; 4 August		Final; 7 August
Preciosa Ocaya (PHI)	1
Liu Jia (CHN)	4	Liu Jia (CHN)	0
Prakaidao Pramari (THA)	5	Prakaidao Pramari (THA)	5
Phan Thị Ngọc Linh (VIE)	0

==== 57 kg ====
Semifinals; 3 August		Final; 7 August
Ana Maria Rey (PHI)
Sararat Kongsawang (THA)	RSCO	Sararat Kongsawang (THA)	3
Harbansh Kaur Sandhu (IND)		Chen Qing (CHN)	2
Chen Qing (CHN)	RSCO

==== 60 kg ====
Semifinals; 5 August		Final; 7 August
		Diana Hamadeh (LIB)	3
Trần Thị Hương (VIE)	5	Trần Thị Hương (VIE)	2
Mamta Verma (IND)	0
