= India at the 2009 Asian Martial Arts Games =

- IOC code: IND
- NOC: Indian Olympic Association

in Bangkok
- Medals Ranked 10th: Gold 3 Silver 7 Bronze 23 Total 33

India won three gold, seven silver and 23 bronze to finish a commendable 10th in the 2009 Asian Martial Arts Games. For India, all the three gold were won by women and two came in kurash, a form of upright jacket wrestling originated in Uzbekistan.

Shally Manral gave India their first gold in the women's 52 kg half-weight category in kurash, while Laxmi Tyagi scored second in the 52 kg low kick kick-boxing. Jaya Chaudhary rounded off India's campaign with a gold in the women's 72 kg half-heavy division in kurash to help the side finish in the top 10 bracket.

== Medal summary ==
=== Medal table ===
Sport	Gold	Silver	Bronze	Total
Kurash	2	1	3	6
Kickboxing	1	0	3	4
Wushu	0	4	1	5
Judo	0	1	5	6
Ju-jitsu	0	1	4	5
Muay Thai	0	0	6	6
Karate	0	0	1	1
Totals (7 entries)	3	7	23	33

== Medalists ==
Medal	Sport	Event	Name
Gold	Kurash	Women’s Half Lightweight -52 kg	Shally Manral
Gold	Kurash	Women’s Half Heavyweight -78 kg	Jaya Chaudhary
Gold	Kickboxing	Low Kick -52kg women	Laxmi Tyagi
Silver	Judo	Men's -100 kg Half-Heavy	Anil Kumar
Silver	Jujitsu	Fighting System (Men -69 kg)	Lalit Singh
Silver	Kurash	Men’s Half Middleweight -81 kg	Manish Kumar
Silver	Wushu & Kungfu	Men’s Sanshou 52 kg	Gulshan
Silver	Wushu & Kungfu	Men’s Duilian Bare Hand Combat	Somorjit Saglosem, Roshan singh Namdeibam, Dewan singh Huidrom
Silver	Wushu & Kungfu	Women’s Sanshou 48 kg	Sanathoi devi Yumnam
Silver	Wushu & Kungfu	Women’s Sanshou 56 kg	Sandhyarani devi Wangkhem
Bronze	Judo	Men's -73 kg Light	Ramashrey Yadav
Bronze	Judo	Women's -48 kg Extra-Light	Khumujam Tombi Devi
Bronze	Judo	Women's -52 kg Half-Light	Kalpana Devi Thoudam
Bronze	Judo	Women's -57 kg Light	ishram nirupama Devi
Bronze	Judo	Women's -63 kg Half-Middle	Garima Chaudhary
Bronze	Jujitsu	Duo Mixed	Sakshi Singh, Lalit Singh
Bronze	Jujitsu	Fighting System (Women -55 kg)	Sakshi Singh
Bronze	Jujitsu	Fighting System (Women -62 kg)	Gule surkhab Wani
Bronze	Jujitsu	Duo Women	Sakshi Singh, Gule surkhab Wani
Bronze	Karate-do	Men Individual Kumite -55 kg	Laxman Singh
Bronze	Kickboxing	Full Contact -75kg men	Sanjay madhusudan Kaoted
Bronze	Kickboxing	Low Kick -71kg men	Arun singh Charak
Bronze	Kickboxing	Full Contact -56kg women	Heena nasreen Jahan
Bronze	Kurash	Men’s Lightweight -73 kg	Praveen Thakur
Bronze	Kurash	Men’s Half Heavyweight -100 kg	Manish Kumar
Bronze	Kurash	Women’s Half Middleweight -63 kg	Narayan Bhal Paul
Bronze	Muay Thai	Men's Fly weight (48-51 kg)	Dolan singh Ningthoukhongjam
Bronze	Muay Thai	Men's Middle weight (71-75 kg)	Balkrishna shekhar Sheety
Bronze	Muay Thai	Women's Pin weight (42-45 kg)	Mudrika
Bronze	Muay Thai	Women's Light Fly weight (45-48 kg)	Sarita devi Nongmaithem
Bronze	Muay Thai	Women's Light Fly weight (45-48 kg)	Harbansh kaur Sandhu
Bronze	Muay Thai	Women's Light weight (57-60 kg)	Mamta Verma
Bronze	Wushu & Kungfu	Women’s Duilian Apparatus Combat	Sapna Devi Yumlembam, Ayapana toshibala Ngangom, Sanathoibi chanu Angom
