= Philippines at the 2009 Asian Martial Arts Games =

- IOC code: PHI
- NOC: Philippine Olympic Committee
- Website: www.olympic.ph (in English)

in Bangkok
- Medals Ranked 19th: Gold 2 Silver 6 Bronze 9 Total 17

Asian Martial Arts Games appearances
- 2009

The Philippines participated in the 2009 Asian Martial Arts Games held in Bangkok, Thailand from 1 to 9 August 2009. The said event was also the first and the last of its edition to be held before merging with the Asian Indoor Games and to be later called Asian Indoor and Martial Arts Games starting 2013. Philippines won 2 gold, 6 silver and 9 bronze medals.

== Medalists ==
=== Gold ===
No.	Medal	Name	Sport	Event
1	Gold	Jeffrey Figueroa	Taekwondo	Men's Bantamweight -62kg
2	Gold	Mary Jane Estimar	Wushu	Women's Sanda 52kg

=== Silver ===
No.	Medal	Name	Sport	Event
1	Silver	Zaidi Laruan	Muay Thai	Men's Lightweight 57-60kg
2	Silver	Jul-Omar Abdulhakim	Pencak Silat	Men's Class B 50-55kg
3	Silver	Marlon Avenido	Taekwondo	Men's Welterweight -78kg
4	Silver	Kirstie Alora	Taekwondo	Women's Middleweight -72kg
5	Silver	Mark Eddiva	Wushu	Men's Sanda 65kg
6	Silver	Mariane Mariano	Wushu	Women's Sanda 60kg

=== Bronze ===
No.	Medal	Name	Sport	Event
1	Bronze	Karen Soloman	Judo	Women's Middleweight -70kg
2	Bronze	Jay Harold Gregorio	Muay Thai	Men's Welterweight 63.5-67kg
3	Bronze	May Libao	Muay Thai	Women's Light Flyweight 45-48kg
4	Bronze	Maricel Subang	Muay Thai	Women's Flyweight 48-51kg
5	Bronze	Preciosa Ocaya	Muay Thai	Women's Bantamweight 51-54kg
6	Bronze	Ana Maria Rey	Muay Thai	Women's Featherweight 54-57kg
7	Bronze	Joemil Solomon	Pencak Silat	Men's Class E 65-70kg
8	Bronze	Marie Charilou Rabino	Pencak Silat	Women's Class D 60-65kg
9	Bronze	Karla Alava	Taekwondo	Women's Bantamweight -55kg
10	Bronze	Dembert Arcita	Wushu	Men's Sanda 52kg

== Medal summary ==
=== By sports ===
Sport	Gold	Silver	Bronze	Total
Taekwondo	1	2	1	4
Wushu	1	2	1	4
Muay Thai	0	1	5	6
Pencak silat	0	1	2	3
Judo	0	0	1	1
Totals (5 entries)	2	6	10	18
