= China at the 2009 Asian Martial Arts Games =

- IOC code: CHN
- NOC: Chinese Olympic Committee external link (in Chinese and English)

in Bangkok
- Medals Ranked 4th: Gold 9 Silver 5 Bronze 5 Total 19

China competed in the 2009 Asian Martial Arts Games which were held in Bangkok, Thailand from August 1, 2009 to August 9, 2009.

== Muay ==
Athlete	Event	Qualification	Round of 16	Quarterfinal	Semifinal	Final / BM	
Athlete	Event	Opposition Result	Opposition Result	Opposition Result	Opposition Result	Opposition Result	Rank
Zhang Xiaolong	63.5 kg	Bye	Bye	(Japan) Katsuji Takahashi; W 5–0	(Jordan) Waleed Al-Jiousi; W	(Thailand) Sakdithat Sakdarat; L	

== Taekwondo ==
Men

Athlete	Event	Qualification	Round of 16	Quarterfinal	Semifinal	Final / BM	
Athlete	Event	Opposition Result	Opposition Result	Opposition Result	Opposition Result	Opposition Result	Rank
Pang Haowen	63 kg	Bye	(Kuwait) Naser Al-Hurais; W 2–1	(Afghanistan) Hasan Rezai; L 3–2			

Women

Athlete	Event	Qualification	Round of 16	Quarterfinal	Semifinal	Final / BM	
Athlete	Event	Opposition Result	Opposition Result	Opposition Result	Opposition Result	Opposition Result	Rank
Zhang Hua	63 kg	Bye	Bye	(Philippines) Maria Camille Manalo; L 7–0	(Kazakhstan) Yekaterina Dmitriyeva; L 11–4	(Brunei) Kaltham Jasim; L 7–0	
Shao Hua	67 kg	Bye	Bye	Bye	(Kazakhstan) Gulnafis Aitmukhambetova; L 5–6	did not advance	
Yang Ping	72 kg	Bye	Bye	(Bhutan) Sangay Wangmo; W 7–0	(Philippines) Kirstie Alora; L -1–0	did not advance	

== See also ==
- China at the Asian Games
- China at the Olympics
- Sports in China
