= 2009 Asian Martial Arts Games =

Martial arts competition

I Asian Martial Arts Games
- Host city: Bangkok, Thailand
- Motto: "The Games of Spirit – The Land of Smiles"
- Nations: 37
- Athletes: 892
- Events: 108 in 9 sports
- Opening: August 1
- Closing: August 9
- Opened by: Vajiralongkorn; Crown Prince of Thailand
- Athlete's Oath: Patiwat Tongtalub
- Judge's Oath: Jatuporn Hemwanno
- Torch lighter: Tony Jaa
- Main venue: Hua Mark Indoor Stadium

2009 Asian Martial Arts Games, officially the 1st Asian Martial Arts Games, were a pancontinental martial arts multi-sport event held in Bangkok, Thailand from 1 to 9 August 2009 with 9 events contested. Due to Political crisis in Thailand And 2009 Swine Flu, the Bangkok Asian Martial Arts Games Organizing Committee (BAMAGOC) and the National Olympic Committee (NOC) of Thailand decided that Asian Martial Arts Games moved from the original schedule of 25 April to 3 May to 1 to 9 August.

This event was the only Asian Martial Arts Games ever held, as four years later the event merged with another Olympic Council of Asia (OCA) event – Asian Indoor Games – to form the larger Asian Indoor and Martial Arts Games.

== Emblem ==
The emblem comprises the letter "A" which stands for Asia that would include the Asian countries and population as well; while the letter "M" stands for Martial Arts Sports. The two connected letters are reflecting the meanings of modernity, activeness and simplicity; combining with the thoughts and cohesiveness of friendship and equality among the countries in Asia for the upcoming Martial Arts Games.

For the overall picture, it is a mixture of contemporary art, manifesting that Thailand is to act as the host of the Games. Red is the main color of the OCA, reflecting the color of the fight, standing for the color of the heart and colorizing the Asian art. Gold is the color of brightness of the Thai Kingdom and is the color for creativity and determination to organize the 1st Asian Martial Arts Games 2009.

Official mascot

== Mascot ==
"Hanuman" is the Hindu God who is considered to be the companion of the Hindu God Rama who has immeasurable fighting skills with strong determination.

The Organizing Committee uses "Hanuman Yindee" as the Mascot as it wants to convey the message of the word "Yindee" which means proudness and gratification. Furthermore, the Organizing Committee is using the word "Yindee" as to extend to everybody a warm welcome and a chance of making continuous friendship and solidarity throughout the entire peoples of Asia.

== Venues ==
- Indoor Stadium Huamark – Karate, Taekwondo
- Nimibutr Stadium – Muaythai
- Jhanthana Yingyong Gymnasium – Kickboxing
- Thai-Japanese Youth Center – Judo, Ju-jitsu, Kurash
- Silpa-archa Gymnasium in Suphan Buri – Wushu
- Chaofah Mahachakree Sirinthorn Gymnasium at Suphanburi Sport School in Suphan Buri – Pencak silat

== Participating nations ==
37 out of the 45 Asian countries took part. Iran, North Korea, United Arab Emirates, Saudi Arabia and Timor-Leste did not compete. Iran, a favourite for a spot at the top of the leader board pulled out of the contest after fears of catching swine flu forced the Iranian National Olympic Committee to advise the country pull out of the contest. Palestine, Kyrgyzstan and Tajikistan did not have any competitors at the games but their athletes still counted in the draw in Taekwondo because of their late withdrawal.

- Afghanistan
- Bahrain
- Bangladesh
- Bhutan
- Brunei
- Cambodia
- China
- Chinese Taipei
- Hong Kong
- India
- Indonesia
- Iraq
- Japan
- Jordan
- Kazakhstan
- Kuwait
- Laos
- Lebanon
- Macau
- Malaysia
- Maldives
- Mongolia
- Myanmar
- Nepal
- Oman (3)
- Pakistan
- Philippines
- Qatar
- Singapore
- South Korea
- Sri Lanka
- Syria
- Thailand
- Turkmenistan
- Uzbekistan
- Vietnam
- Yemen

== Sports ==
- Judo (14)
- Ju-jitsu (7)
- Karate (10)
- Kickboxing (10)
- Kurash (14)
- Muaythai (15)
- Pencak silat (11)
- Taekwondo (16)
- Wushu (11)

== Calendar ==
OC	Opening ceremony	●	Event competitions	1	Event finals	CC	Closing ceremony

August 2009	1st Sat	2nd Sun	3rd Mon	4th Tue	5th Wed	6th Thu	7th Fri	8th Sat	9th Sun	Gold medals
Ceremonies	OC								CC	
Judo		8	6							14
Ju-jitsu				2	3	2				7
Karate						3	4	3		10
Kickboxing			●	●	●		10			10
Kurash						4	5	5		14
Muaythai		●	●	●	●		15			15
Pencak silat			●	●	●		11			11
Taekwondo		4	4	4	4					16
Wushu					2	1	●	8		11
Total gold medals		12	10	6	9	10	45	16		108
August 2009	1st Sat	2nd Sun	3rd Mon	4th Tue	5th Wed	6th Thu	7th Fri	8th Sat	9th Sun	Gold medals

== Medal table ==
* Host nation (Thailand)

Rank	Nation	Gold	Silver	Bronze	Total
1	Thailand (THA)*	21	17	16	54
2	Kazakhstan (KAZ)	15	7	12	34
3	South Korea (KOR)	10	6	3	19
4	China (CHN)	9	5	5	19
5	Japan (JPN)	9	2	3	14
6	Vietnam (VIE)	7	11	21	39
7	Indonesia (INA)	5	6	5	16
8	Uzbekistan (UZB)	4	5	12	21
9	Chinese Taipei (TPE)	4	5	11	20
10	India (IND)	3	7	23	33
11	Pakistan (PAK)	3	2	4	9
12	Philippines (PHI)	2	6	10	18
13	Iraq (IRQ)	2	3	5	10
14	Malaysia (MAS)	2	3	3	8
15	Afghanistan (AFG)	2	2	8	12
15	Jordan (JOR)	2	2	8	12
17	Syria (SYR)	2	1	3	6
18	Laos (LAO)	1	4	9	14
19	Mongolia (MGL)	1	3	3	7
20	Bahrain (BRN)	1	1	3	5
21	Lebanon (LIB)	1	1	2	4
21	Macau (MAC)	1	1	2	4
21	Turkmenistan (TKM)	1	1	2	4
24	Hong Kong (HKG)	0	2	3	5
24	Singapore (SIN)	0	2	3	5
26	Kuwait (KUW)	0	1	4	5
27	Brunei (BRU)	0	1	2	3
28	Myanmar (MYA)	0	1	1	2
29	Sri Lanka (SRI)	0	0	2	2
30	Bhutan (BHU)	0	0	1	1
30	Nepal (NEP)	0	0	1	1
30	Qatar (QAT)	0	0	1	1
Totals (32 entries)		108	108	191	407

Preceded by Inaugural	Asian Martial Arts Games; Bangkok; I Asian Martial Arts Games (2009)	Succeeded by Asian Indoor and Martial Arts Games
