= Thailand at the 2009 Asian Martial Arts Games =

- IOC code: THA
- NOC: National Olympic Committee of Thailand
- Website: www.olympicthai.or.th/eng (in English and Thai)

in Bangkok
- Medals Ranked 1st: Gold 21 Silver 17 Bronze 16 Total 54

Thailand participated and hosted the 2009 Asian Martial Arts Games held in the capital city of Bangkok from August 1, 2009 to August 9, 2009. As host nation, Thailand finished with a total of 21 gold medals, 17 silver medals, and 16 bronze medals to secure its top spot in the medal tally.
