= Short course swimming at the 2017 Asian Indoor and Martial Arts Games =

Swimming competition

- Venue: Ashgabat Aquatics Centre
- Dates: 22–25 September 2017

The Short course swimming at the 2017 Asian Indoor and Martial Arts Games in Ashgabat, Turkmenistan took place from 22 to 25 September at the Ashgabat Aquatics Centre.

== Medalists ==
=== Men ===
Event	Gold		Silver		Bronze	
50 m freestyle	Adil Kaskabay; Kazakhstan	21.88	Khurshidjon Tursunov; Uzbekistan	22.04	Lin Chien-liang; Chinese Taipei	22.26
100 m freestyle	Adil Kaskabay; Kazakhstan	47.63; GR	Lin Chien-liang; Chinese Taipei	48.53	Aleksey Tarasenko; Uzbekistan	48.59
200 m freestyle	An Ting-yao; Chinese Taipei	1:44.73	Qin Haiyang; China	1:45.37	Jang Dong-hyeok; South Korea	1:46.41
50 m backstroke	Jeong Dong-won; South Korea	23.22; GR	Wang Peng; China	23.76	Trần Duy Khôi; Vietnam	24.03
100 m backstroke	Jeong Dong-won; South Korea	51.28	Adil Kaskabay; Kazakhstan	51.55	Trần Duy Khôi; Vietnam	52.04
50 m breaststroke	Wang Lizhuo; China	26.65; GR	He Zilong; China	27.05	Kim Jae-youn; South Korea	27.13
100 m breaststroke	Wang Lizhuo; China	57.02; GR	Kim Jae-youn; South Korea	58.54	Moon Jae-kwon; South Korea	58.66
50 m butterfly	Wang Peng; China	22.80; GR	Jeon Sung-min; South Korea	23.25	Artyom Kozlyuk; Uzbekistan	23.47
100 m butterfly	Wang Peng; China	51.41	Sajan Prakash; India	51.97	Artyom Kozlyuk; Uzbekistan	52.02
100 m individual medley	Roman Trussov; Kazakhstan	54.58	Radomyos Matjiur; Thailand	54.81	Raymond Mak; Hong Kong	55.52
200 m individual medley	Qin Haiyang; China	1:55.20; GR	An Ting-yao; Chinese Taipei	1:56.90	Trần Duy Khôi; Vietnam	1:57.60
4 × 50 m freestyle relay	Chinese Taipei; Lin Chien-liang; Chang Kuo-chi; An Ting-yao; Wang Yu-lian	1:28.08; GR	China; Wang Lizhuo; Qin Haiyang; Chen Qiuyu; Wang Peng; Zhang Yixiang	1:28.18	Uzbekistan; Aleksey Tarasenko; Daniil Bukin; Artyom Kozlyuk; Khurshidjon Tursunov	1:28.79
4 × 100 m freestyle relay	Chinese Taipei; An Ting-yao; Lin Chien-liang; Chang Kuo-chi; Wang Yu-lian	3:14.60; GR	China; Wang Lizhuo; Chen Qiuyu; Lin Tao; Qin Haiyang; Zhang Yixiang	3:15.82	Uzbekistan; Aleksey Tarasenko; Daniil Bukin; Artyom Kozlyuk; Khurshidjon Tursunov	3:15.96
4 × 50 m medley relay	South Korea; Jeong Dong-won; Moon Jae-kwon; Jeon Sung-min; Jang Dong-hyeok	1:35.28; GR	China; Wang Yutian; He Zilong; Wang Peng; Chen Qiuyu	1:35.91	Kazakhstan; Adil Kaskabay; Aibek Kamzenov; Adilbek Mussin; Roman Trussov	1:37.01
4 × 100 m medley relay	China; Wang Peng; Wang Lizhuo; Qin Haiyang; Chen Qiuyu; He Zilong; Lin Tao	3:29.75; GR	South Korea; Jeong Dong-won; Kim Jae-youn; Jeon Sung-min; Jang Dong-hyeok; Lee Ju-ho; Moon Jae-kwon; Yoo Kyu-sang	3:31.76	Kazakhstan; Adil Kaskabay; Roman Trussov; Adilbek Mussin; Aibek Kamzenov	3:33.83

=== Women ===
Event	Gold		Silver		Bronze	
50 m freestyle	Jenjira Srisa-ard; Thailand	24.71; GR	Lao Lihui; China	24.99	Natthanan Junkrajang; Thailand	25.38
100 m freestyle	Sun Meichen; China	53.31; GR	Sze Hang Yu; Hong Kong	54.21	Lao Lihui; China	54.55
200 m freestyle	Sun Meichen; China	1:55.57; GR	Nguyễn Thị Ánh Viên; Vietnam	1:56.06	Tinky Ho; Hong Kong	1:58.03
50 m backstroke	Yang Yifan; China	27.37	Toto Wong; Hong Kong	27.80	Jiang Yuru; China	27.98
100 m backstroke	Stephanie Au; Hong Kong	58.94	Yang Yifan; China	59.16	Jiang Yuru; China	59.25
50 m breaststroke	Kim Dal-eun; South Korea	30.88; GR	Jenjira Srisa-ard; Thailand	31.02	Yvette Kong; Hong Kong	31.32
100 m breaststroke	Kim Dal-eun; South Korea	1:07.51	Rainbow Ip; Hong Kong	1:07.84	Natalie Kan; Hong Kong	1:09.19
50 m butterfly	Jenjira Srisa-ard; Thailand	26.18	Park Ye-rin; South Korea	26.33	Chan Kin Lok; Hong Kong	26.74
100 m butterfly	Chan Kin Lok; Hong Kong	58.15	Sun Meichen; China	58.25	Park Ye-rin; South Korea	58.40
100 m individual medley	Nguyễn Thị Ánh Viên; Vietnam	1:00.68; GR	Zhang Chenyao; China	1:00.91	Qian Xinan; China	1:01.77
200 m individual medley	Nguyễn Thị Ánh Viên; Vietnam	2:09.78; GR	Zhang Chenyao; China	2:12.67	Qian Xinan; China	2:13.93
4 × 50 m freestyle relay	China; Lao Lihui; Feng Ling; Yu Liyan; Sun Meichen	1:40.16; GR	Hong Kong; Sze Hang Yu; Chan Kin Lok; Tam Hoi Lam; Stephanie Au	1:40.26	Thailand; Jenjira Srisa-ard; Supasuta Sounthornchote; Pusanisa Sangplong; Natthanan Junkrajang	1:41.16
4 × 100 m freestyle relay	China; Lao Lihui; Feng Ling; Yu Liyan; Sun Meichen	3:37.94; GR	Hong Kong; Stephanie Au; Tinky Ho; Wong Cho Ying; Sze Hang Yu	3:40.18	Thailand; Jenjira Srisa-ard; Supasuta Sounthornchote; Juthamas Sutthison; Natthanan Junkrajang	3:45.83
4 × 50 m medley relay	Hong Kong; Stephanie Au; Yvette Kong; Chan Kin Lok; Sze Hang Yu; Erica Lau; Rainbow Ip; Wong Yuk Yan; Tam Hoi Lam	1:48.79; GR	China; Yang Yifan; Lao Lihui; Yu Liyan; Sun Meichen	1:51.64	Shared silver	
4 × 50 m medley relay	Hong Kong; Stephanie Au; Yvette Kong; Chan Kin Lok; Sze Hang Yu; Erica Lau; Rainbow Ip; Wong Yuk Yan; Tam Hoi Lam	1:48.79; GR	Thailand; Juthamas Sutthison; Jenjira Srisa-ard; Supasuta Sounthornchote; Natthanan Junkrajang; Chavunnooch Salubluek; Pusanisa Sangplong	1:51.64	Shared silver	
4 × 100 m medley relay	Hong Kong; Stephanie Au; Rainbow Ip; Chan Kin Lok; Sze Hang Yu	3:58.32	China; Jiang Yuru; Lao Lihui; Yu Liyan; Sun Meichen	4:04.46	Thailand; Natthanan Junkrajang; Chavunnooch Salubluek; Supasuta Sounthornchote; Jenjira Srisa-ard	4:09.30

== Medal table ==
Rank	Nation	Gold	Silver	Bronze	Total
1	China (CHN)	11	13	5	29
2	South Korea (KOR)	5	4	4	13
3	Hong Kong (HKG)	4	5	5	14
4	Chinese Taipei (TPE)	3	2	1	6
5	Kazakhstan (KAZ)	3	1	2	6
6	Thailand (THA)	2	3	4	9
7	Vietnam (VIE)	2	1	3	6
8	Uzbekistan (UZB)	0	1	5	6
9	India (IND)	0	1	0	1
Totals (9 entries)		30	31	29	90

== Results ==
=== Men ===
==== 50 m freestyle ====
22 September

Rank	Athlete	Heats	Final
1st place, gold medalist(s)	Adil Kaskabay (KAZ)	21.85	21.88
2nd place, silver medalist(s)	Khurshidjon Tursunov (UZB)	22.55	22.04
3rd place, bronze medalist(s)	Lin Chien-liang (TPE)	22.28	22.26
4	Chen Qiuyu (CHN)	22.54	22.34
5	Aleksey Tarasenko (UZB)	22.54	22.49
6	Andrew Newling (THA)	22.75	22.56
7	Jeremy Wong (HKG)	22.79 ^{(22.77)}	22.64
8	Adilbek Mussin (KAZ)	22.76	22.73
9	Chang Kuo-chi (TPE)	22.79 ^{(22.78)}	
10	Jang Dong-hyeok (KOR)	22.82	
11	Mohammed Bedour (JOR)	22.98	
12	Anthony Barbar (LBN)	22.99	
13	Benyamin Gharehhassanloo (IRI)	23.00	
14	Sina Gholampour (IRI)	23.03	
15	Kitiphat Pipimnan (THA)	23.08	
16	Martin Lam (HKG)	23.22	
17	Stanislav Karnaukhov (KGZ)	23.70	
18	Epeli Rabua (FIJ)	23.75	
19	Walentin Gorşkow (TKM)	23.77	
20	Huang Junyi (CHN)	23.82	
21	Srihari Nataraj (IND)	23.84	
22	Yousif Bu Arish (KSA)	23.85	
23	Agajan Joraýew (TKM)	24.01	
24	Abdalla Aboughazala (QAT)	24.30	
25	Eugene Kado (FIJ)	24.37	
26	Leonard Kalate (PNG)	24.61	
27	Firas Saidi (QAT)	24.68	
28	Temaruata Strickland (COK)	24.74	
28	Lao Kuan Fong (MAC)	24.74	
30	Faisal Al-Shelati (KSA)	24.85	
31	Muhammad Yahya Khan (PAK)	24.96	
31	Tanner Poppe (GUM)	24.96	
33	Mahmudun Nobi Nahid (BAN)	25.05	
34	Olim Kurbanov (TJK)	25.30	
35	Noel Keane (PLW)	25.39	
36	Sirish Gurung (NEP)	25.43	
37	Finau Ohuafi (TGA)	25.60	
38	Kaleo Kihleng (FSM)	25.71	
39	Santiago Poppe (GUM)	25.76	
40	Malcolm Gaymann (PLW)	26.25	
41	Dionisio Augustine (FSM)	26.52	
42	Andrew Lapuka (TGA)	26.63	
43	Ali Imaan (MDV)	27.13	
44	Hassan Ashraf (MDV)	27.74	
45	Farhod Oripov (TJK)	28.41	
46	Andrew Qumsieh (PLE)	29.13	
47	Hamid Rahimi (AFG)	29.76	
48	Darren Almen (MHL)	29.86	
49	George Al-Soos (PLE)	30.42	

==== 100 m freestyle ====
25 September

Rank	Athlete	Heats	Final
1st place, gold medalist(s)	Adil Kaskabay (KAZ)	49.38	47.63
2nd place, silver medalist(s)	Lin Chien-liang (TPE)	49.70	48.53
3rd place, bronze medalist(s)	Aleksey Tarasenko (UZB)	49.97	48.59
4	Wang Yu-lian (TPE)	49.80	48.75
5	Jeremy Wong (HKG)	49.42	48.91
6	Sina Gholampour (IRI)	49.11	49.04
7	Mohammed Bedour (JOR)	49.99	49.72
8	Sajan Prakash (IND)	49.97	50.18
9	Jang Dong-hyeok (KOR)	50.08	
10	Andrew Newling (THA)	50.14	
11	Chao Man Hou (MAC)	50.18	
12	Khurshidjon Tursunov (UZB)	50.24	
13	Siwat Matangkapong (THA)	50.65	
14	Martin Lam (HKG)	50.90	
15	Benyamin Gharehhassanloo (IRI)	51.35	
16	Netani Ross (FIJ)	52.23	
17	Stanislav Karnaukhov (KGZ)	52.30	
18	Walentin Gorşkow (TKM)	52.32	
19	Ilýa Klubçenko (TKM)	52.45	
20	Yousif Bu Arish (KSA)	52.70	
21	Leonard Kalate (PNG)	53.79	
22	Eugene Kado (FIJ)	54.40	
23	Mahmudun Nobi Nahid (BAN)	54.41	
24	Tanner Poppe (GUM)	54.43	
25	Faisal Al-Shelati (KSA)	54.44	
26	Temaruata Strickland (COK)	54.85	
27	Muhammad Yahya Khan (PAK)	55.15	
28	Noel Keane (PLW)	55.34	
29	Kaleo Kihleng (FSM)	55.40	
30	Malcolm Gaymann (PLW)	55.80	
31	Bede Aitu (COK)	56.80	
32	Qin Haiyang (CHN)	56.93	
33	Olim Kurbanov (TJK)	57.01	
34	Santiago Poppe (GUM)	57.51	
35	Finau Ohuafi (TGA)	58.48	
36	Andrew Lapuka (TGA)	1:00.07	
37	Wang Peng (CHN)	1:00.32	
38	Ali Imaan (MDV)	1:01.81	
39	Ali Reza Nasiri (AFG)	1:04.45	
40	Andrew Qumsieh (PLE)	1:05.34	
41	George Al-Soos (PLE)	1:07.22	
42	Darren Almen (MHL)	1:07.24	
—	Firas Saidi (QAT)	DNS	
—	Abdalla Aboughazala (QAT)	DNS	

==== 200 m freestyle ====
24 September

Rank	Athlete	Heats	Final
1st place, gold medalist(s)	An Ting-yao (TPE)	1:49.60	1:44.73
2nd place, silver medalist(s)	Qin Haiyang (CHN)	1:49.60	1:45.37
3rd place, bronze medalist(s)	Jang Dong-hyeok (KOR)	1:49.44	1:46.41
4	Aleksey Tarasenko (UZB)	1:49.50	1:46.51
5	Sajan Prakash (IND)	1:50.58	1:48.66
6	Nguyễn Hữu Kim Sơn (VIE)	1:50.74	1:50.19
7	Khurshidjon Tursunov (UZB)	1:50.82	1:52.02
8	Wong Ming Hong (HKG)	1:49.81	1:52.21
9	Siwat Matangkapong (THA)	1:51.02	
10	Chan Chun Hei (HKG)	1:51.36	
11	Huang Junyi (CHN)	1:51.77	
12	Tanakrit Kittiya (THA)	1:51.82	
13	Lin Sizhuang (MAC)	1:51.88	
14	Alireza Yavari (IRI)	1:52.33	
15	Abdalla Aboughazala (QAT)	1:57.23	
16	Firas Saidi (QAT)	1:57.33	
17	Taichi Vakasama (FIJ)	1:58.11	
18	Faisal Al-Shelati (KSA)	2:00.98	
19	Netani Ross (FIJ)	2:02.57	
20	Amar Al-Humaid (KSA)	2:03.66	
21	Kaleo Kihleng (FSM)	2:04.18	
22	Noel Keane (PLW)	2:04.76	
23	Begenç Gurbanow (TKM)	2:05.03	
24	Malcolm Gaymann (PLW)	2:05.56	
25	Ezizguly Ballykow (TKM)	2:13.15	
26	Mubal Azzam Ibrahim (MDV)	2:14.12	
27	Ali Imaan (MDV)	2:16.17	

==== 50 m backstroke ====
23 September

Rank	Athlete	Heats	Final
1st place, gold medalist(s)	Jeong Dong-won (KOR)	23.41	23.22
2nd place, silver medalist(s)	Wang Peng (CHN)	23.89	23.76
3rd place, bronze medalist(s)	Trần Duy Khôi (VIE)	24.21	24.03
4	Adil Kaskabay (KAZ)	24.32	24.15
5	Lau Shiu Yue (HKG)	24.90	24.50
6	Wang Yutian (CHN)	25.04	24.74
7	Merdan Ataýew (TKM)	24.81	24.77
8	Wang Yu-lian (TPE)	25.31	24.81
9	Mohammed Bedour (JOR)	25.78	
10	Chang Kuo-chi (TPE)	25.85	
11	Matthew Chung (HKG)	25.87	
12	Jamal Chavoshifar (IRI)	26.01	
13	Srihari Nataraj (IND)	26.09	
14	Mohsen Mehmannavaz (IRI)	26.15	
15	Daniil Bukin (UZB)	26.30	
16	Netani Ross (FIJ)	26.56	
17	Trương Thế Anh (VIE)	26.61	
18	Jiarapong Sangkhawat (THA)	26.88	
19	Nikita Baryşnikow (TKM)	27.29	
20	Muhammad Yahya Khan (PAK)	27.41	
21	Lao Kuan Fong (MAC)	28.09	
22	Bede Aitu (COK)	28.74	
23	Abdulaziz Al-Obaidly (QAT)	28.78	
24	Amar Al-Humaid (KSA)	29.03	
25	Noel Keane (PLW)	29.24	
26	Waqas Hussain (PAK)	29.63	
27	Finau Ohuafi (TGA)	30.15	
28	Olim Kurbanov (TJK)	30.37	
29	Malcolm Gaymann (PLW)	30.71	
30	Ali Imaan (MDV)	31.28	
31	Santiago Poppe (GUM)	31.36	
32	Dionisio Augustine (FSM)	31.39	
33	Ramziyor Khorkashov (TJK)	33.18	
34	Mohamed Mahmoud (QAT)	33.23	
35	Andrew Lapuka (TGA)	35.14	
36	Darren Almen (MHL)	35.32	
—	Khaled Awadallah (JOR)	DNS	

==== 100 m backstroke ====
24 September

Rank	Athlete	Heats	Final
1st place, gold medalist(s)	Jeong Dong-won (KOR)	53.77	51.28
2nd place, silver medalist(s)	Adil Kaskabay (KAZ)	56.00	51.55
3rd place, bronze medalist(s)	Trần Duy Khôi (VIE)	53.69	52.04
4	Lee Ju-ho (KOR)	54.05	52.57
5	Merdan Ataýew (TKM)	53.49	52.86
6	Wang Peng (CHN)	55.02	53.32
7	Lau Shiu Yue (HKG)	55.24	54.10
8	Srihari Nataraj (IND)	55.94	56.03
9	Zhang Yixiang (CHN)	56.29	
10	Trương Thế Anh (VIE)	56.50	
11	Soroush Ghandchi (IRI)	56.77	
12	Jamal Chavoshifar (IRI)	56.87	
13	Matthew Chung (HKG)	57.64	
14	Daniil Bukin (UZB)	58.54	
15	Netani Ross (FIJ)	59.76	
16	Musa Jalaýew (TKM)	59.92	
17	Bede Aitu (COK)	1:01.81	
18	Khaled Awadallah (JOR)	1:02.35	
19	Abdulaziz Al-Obaidly (QAT)	1:02.63	
20	Waqas Hussain (PAK)	1:02.77	
21	Noel Keane (PLW)	1:03.13	
22	Abdelrahman Hesham Mohamed (QAT)	1:03.95	
23	Amar Al-Humaid (KSA)	1:05.71	
24	Faisal Al-Shelati (KSA)	1:07.37	
25	Ali Imaan (MDV)	1:11.17	

==== 50 m breaststroke ====
23 September

Rank	Athlete	Heats	Final
1st place, gold medalist(s)	Wang Lizhuo (CHN)	26.71	26.65
2nd place, silver medalist(s)	He Zilong (CHN)	27.29	27.05
3rd place, bronze medalist(s)	Kim Jae-youn (KOR)	27.24	27.13
4	Roman Trussov (KAZ)	27.51	27.24
5	Chao Man Hou (MAC)	27.74	27.36
6	Kirill Vais (KGZ)	27.57	27.56
7	Aibek Kamzenov (KAZ)	27.73	27.60
8	Trương Thế Anh (VIE)	28.25	28.37
9	Mehdi Ansari (IRI)	27.98	
10	Aria Nasimi Shad (IRI)	28.32	
11	Kitiphat Pipimnan (THA)	28.63	
12	Ng Yan Kin (HKG)	28.71	
13	Wong Chun Yan (HKG)	28.82	
14	Epeli Rabua (FIJ)	29.01	
15	Taichi Vakasama (FIJ)	29.09	
16	Ashley Seeto (PNG)	29.22	
17	Ryan Maskelyne (PNG)	29.47	
18	Naser Yaser Hassaan (QAT)	29.79	
19	Berdyguly Saparow (TKM)	30.19	
20	Amro Al-Wir (JOR)	30.22	
21	Süleýman Ataýew (TKM)	30.84	
22	Sayf Al-Hatabeh (JOR)	31.26	
23	Bede Aitu (COK)	31.51	
24	Dionisio Augustine (FSM)	31.95	
25	Sirish Gurung (NEP)	32.37	
26	Malcolm Gaymann (PLW)	32.55	
27	Eisa Al-Nasser (KSA)	32.73	
28	Noel Keane (PLW)	32.89	
29	Muhammad Hamza Malik (PAK)	33.44	
30	Ramziyor Khorkashov (TJK)	34.03	
31	Hassan Ashraf (MDV)	34.17	
32	Mohamed Mahmoud (QAT)	34.48	
33	Andrew Lapuka (TGA)	34.92	
34	Hamid Rahimi (AFG)	35.84	
—	Finau Ohuafi (TGA)	DSQ	

==== 100 m breaststroke ====
22 September

Rank	Athlete	Heats	Final
1st place, gold medalist(s)	Wang Lizhuo (CHN)	58.24	57.02
2nd place, silver medalist(s)	Kim Jae-youn (KOR)	59.09	58.54
3rd place, bronze medalist(s)	Moon Jae-kwon (KOR)	59.59	58.66
4	He Zilong (CHN)	58.54	58.78
5	Roman Trussov (KAZ)	59.51	59.05
6	Chao Man Hou (MAC)	59.78	59.43
7	Kirill Vais (KGZ)	1:00.75	1:00.37
8	Mehdi Ansari (IRI)	1:00.76	1:00.46
9	Aibek Kamzenov (KAZ)	1:00.90	
10	Radomyos Matjiur (THA)	1:00.97	
11	Trương Thế Anh (VIE)	1:01.52	
12	Ng Yan Kin (HKG)	1:01.71	
13	Taichi Vakasama (FIJ)	1:01.94	
14	Ryan Maskelyne (PNG)	1:02.19	
15	Aria Nasimi Shad (IRI)	1:02.28	
16	Kwok Ka Fai (HKG)	1:02.40	
17	Epeli Rabua (FIJ)	1:04.05	
18	Amro Al-Wir (JOR)	1:04.34	
19	Ashley Seeto (PNG)	1:04.69	
20	Batyr Täçmyradow (TKM)	1:04.89	
21	Berdyguly Saparow (TKM)	1:06.21	
22	Naser Yaser Hassaan (QAT)	1:06.83	
23	Mohamed Mahmoud (QAT)	1:08.23	
24	Sayf Al-Hatabeh (JOR)	1:08.27	
25	Bede Aitu (COK)	1:08.69	
26	Eisa Al-Nasser (KSA)	1:09.40	
27	Malcolm Gaymann (PLW)	1:11.06	
28	Dionisio Augustine (FSM)	1:11.21	
29	Noel Keane (PLW)	1:12.46	
30	Muhammad Hamza Malik (PAK)	1:12.67	
31	Hassan Ashraf (MDV)	1:17.00	
32	Andrew Lapuka (TGA)	1:20.49	

==== 50 m butterfly ====
24 September

Rank	Athlete	Heats	Final
1st place, gold medalist(s)	Wang Peng (CHN)	22.81	22.80
2nd place, silver medalist(s)	Jeon Sung-min (KOR)	23.47	23.25
3rd place, bronze medalist(s)	Artyom Kozlyuk (UZB)	23.49	23.47
4	Mehdi Ansari (IRI)	24.00	23.76
5	Adilbek Mussin (KAZ)	24.37	23.79
6	Sajan Prakash (IND)	24.21	23.91
7	Anthony Barbar (LBN)	24.38	24.08
8	Chu Chen-ping (TPE)	24.31	24.37
9	Andrew Newling (THA)	24.51	
10	Yoo Kyu-sang (KOR)	24.54	
11	Chen Qiuyu (CHN)	24.62	
12	Chang Kuo-chi (TPE)	24.66	
13	Kwong Ka Ho (HKG)	24.76	
14	Mohammed Bedour (JOR)	24.86	
15	Yousif Bu Arish (KSA)	24.91	
16	Jimmy Wong (HKG)	24.99	
17	Huỳnh Mẫn Đạt (VIE)	25.04	
18	Ezizguly Ballykow (TKM)	25.33	
19	Sio Ka Kun (MAC)	25.47	
20	Ruslan Nazarow (TKM)	25.50	
21	Mahmudun Nobi Nahid (BAN)	25.58	
22	Lao Kuan Fong (MAC)	25.98	
23	Epeli Rabua (FIJ)	25.99	
24	Ryan Maskelyne (PNG)	26.22	
25	Khaled Awadallah (JOR)	26.37	
26	Eugene Kado (FIJ)	26.44	
27	Leonard Kalate (PNG)	26.89	
28	Kaleo Kihleng (FSM)	27.35	
29	Temaruata Strickland (COK)	27.42	
30	Hassan Al-Yousef (KSA)	27.45	
31	Noel Keane (PLW)	27.61	
32	Tanner Poppe (GUM)	27.84	
33	Finau Ohuafi (TGA)	28.21	
34	Farrukh Shahzad (PAK)	28.38	
35	Olim Kurbanov (TJK)	28.50	
36	Mohamed Mahmoud (QAT)	28.81	
37	Malcolm Gaymann (PLW)	29.27	
38	Dionisio Augustine (FSM)	29.62	
39	Andrew Lapuka (TGA)	29.97	
40	Mohammed Fahad Hussain (QAT)	30.16	
41	Santiago Poppe (GUM)	30.58	
42	Ali Reza Nasiri (AFG)	32.74	
—	Sina Gholampour (IRI)	DNS	

==== 100 m butterfly ====
23 September

Rank	Athlete	Heats	Final
1st place, gold medalist(s)	Wang Peng (CHN)	53.56	51.41
2nd place, silver medalist(s)	Sajan Prakash (IND)	53.34	51.97
3rd place, bronze medalist(s)	Artyom Kozlyuk (UZB)	52.78	52.02
4	Adilbek Mussin (KAZ)	53.51	52.51
5	Chu Chen-ping (TPE)	53.22	52.70
6	Mehdi Ansari (IRI)	53.23	52.83
7	Yoo Kyu-sang (KOR)	54.49	53.21
8	Kwong Ka Ho (HKG)	54.10	53.93
9	Huỳnh Mẫn Đạt (VIE)	55.21	
10	Anthony Barbar (LBN)	55.88	
11	Mahmudun Nobi Nahid (BAN)	56.07	
12	Jimmy Wong (HKG)	56.10	
13	Yan Weize (CHN)	56.14	
14	Yousif Bu Arish (KSA)	56.68	
15	Tanakrit Kittiya (THA)	56.97	
16	Ruslan Nazarow (TKM)	57.31	
17	Sio Ka Kun (MAC)	58.42	
18	Epeli Rabua (FIJ)	58.81	
19	Ezizguly Ballykow (TKM)	58.82	
20	Khaled Awadallah (JOR)	59.08	
21	Kaleo Kihleng (FSM)	1:00.65	
22	Firas Saidi (QAT)	1:00.69	
23	Eugene Kado (FIJ)	1:00.79	
24	Hassan Al-Yousef (KSA)	1:01.08	
25	Tanner Poppe (GUM)	1:02.06	
26	Farrukh Shahzad (PAK)	1:03.69	
27	Mohammed Fahad Hussain (QAT)	1:05.90	
—	Alireza Yavari (IRI)	DNS	

==== 100 m individual medley ====
25 September

Rank	Athlete	Heats	Final
1st place, gold medalist(s)	Roman Trussov (KAZ)	55.40	54.58
2nd place, silver medalist(s)	Radomyos Matjiur (THA)	56.33	54.81
3rd place, bronze medalist(s)	Raymond Mak (HKG)	55.82	55.52
4	Mehdi Ansari (IRI)	55.60	55.58
5	Sajan Prakash (IND)	56.14	55.76
6	Artyom Kozlyuk (UZB)	56.27	55.80
7	Fung Chun Ho (HKG)	56.45	56.03
8	Jiarapong Sangkhawat (THA)	57.11	57.31
9	Trương Thế Anh (VIE)	57.21	
10	Wang Yutian (CHN)	57.60	
11	Lin Sizhuang (MAC)	57.99	
12	Jamal Chavoshifar (IRI)	58.13	
13	Zhao Liangzhou (CHN)	58.72	
14	Taichi Vakasama (FIJ)	58.86	
15	Walentin Gorşkow (TKM)	58.99	
16	Epeli Rabua (FIJ)	59.24	
17	Ryan Maskelyne (PNG)	59.51	
18	Muhammad Yahya Khan (PAK)	1:00.68	
19	Ashley Seeto (PNG)	1:01.72	
20	Khaled Awadallah (JOR)	1:01.76	
21	Trần Duy Khôi (VIE)	1:01.87	
22	Noel Keane (PLW)	1:02.00	
22	Teýmur Ýusupow (TKM)	1:02.00	
24	Bede Aitu (COK)	1:02.94	
25	Amro Al-Wir (JOR)	1:03.13	
26	Hassan Al-Yousef (KSA)	1:03.70	
27	Amar Al-Humaid (KSA)	1:03.94	
28	Malcolm Gaymann (PLW)	1:04.94	
29	Farrukh Shahzad (PAK)	1:08.65	
30	Mubal Azzam Ibrahim (MDV)	1:10.13	
31	Darren Almen (MHL)	1:20.96	
—	Abdelrahman Hesham Mohamed (QAT)	DNS	
—	Mohamed Mahmoud (QAT)	DNS	

==== 200 m individual medley ====
22 September

Rank	Athlete	Heats	Final
1st place, gold medalist(s)	Qin Haiyang (CHN)	2:01.73	1:55.20
2nd place, silver medalist(s)	An Ting-yao (TPE)	2:03.03	1:56.90
3rd place, bronze medalist(s)	Trần Duy Khôi (VIE)	2:03.86	1:57.60
4	Lin Tao (CHN)	2:02.04	2:00.23
5	Fung Chun Ho (HKG)	2:04.04	2:01.31
6	Nguyễn Hữu Kim Sơn (VIE)	2:02.95	2:04.78
7	Lin Sizhuang (MAC)	2:05.73	2:05.02
8	Raymond Mak (HKG)	2:04.26	2:05.25
9	Aleksey Tarasenko (UZB)	2:06.87	
10	Ilýa Klubçenko (TKM)	2:13.30	
11	Leonard Kalate (PNG)	2:15.28	
12	Khaled Awadallah (JOR)	2:16.42	
13	Abdelrahman Hesham Mohamed (QAT)	2:17.40	
14	Noel Keane (PLW)	2:17.73	
15	Abdulaziz Al-Obaidly (QAT)	2:17.95	
16	Waqas Hussain (PAK)	2:21.99	
17	Eisa Al-Nasser (KSA)	2:22.21	
18	Hassan Al-Yousef (KSA)	2:23.07	
19	Malcolm Gaymann (PLW)	2:23.28	
20	Teýmur Ýusupow (TKM)	2:24.98	
21	Mubal Azzam Ibrahim (MDV)	2:35.51	
—	Sayf Al-Hatabeh (JOR)	DNS	

==== 4 × 50 m freestyle relay ====
24 September

Rank	Team	Heats	Final
1st place, gold medalist(s)	Chinese Taipei (TPE)	1:30.17	1:28.08
2nd place, silver medalist(s)	China (CHN)	1:30.11	1:28.18
3rd place, bronze medalist(s)	Uzbekistan (UZB)	1:30.78	1:28.79
4	Kazakhstan (KAZ)	1:30.52	1:28.99
5	South Korea (KOR)	1:30.27	1:29.34
6	Iran (IRI)	1:30.93	1:30.18
7	Thailand (THA)	1:31.07	1:30.29
8	Hong Kong (HKG)	1:32.10	1:30.43
9	Macau (MAC)	1:33.60	
10	Turkmenistan (TKM)	1:35.96	
11	Fiji (FIJ)	1:37.68	
12	Jordan (JOR)	1:39.37	
13	Qatar (QAT)	1:40.77	
14	Saudi Arabia (KSA)	1:42.29	
15	Pakistan (PAK)	1:47.37	
—	Tajikistan (TJK)	DNS	

==== 4 × 100 m freestyle relay ====
23 September

Rank	Team	Heats	Final
1st place, gold medalist(s)	Chinese Taipei (TPE)	3:22.79	3:14.60
2nd place, silver medalist(s)	China (CHN)	3:18.99	3:15.82
3rd place, bronze medalist(s)	Uzbekistan (UZB)	3:20.90	3:15.96
4	Kazakhstan (KAZ)	3:21.08	3:18.05
5	Hong Kong (HKG)	3:22.20	3:19.18
6	Iran (IRI)	3:20.76	3:19.98
7	Macau (MAC)	3:29.90	3:26.34
8	Turkmenistan (TKM)	3:32.35	3:32.57
9	Thailand (THA)	3:36.54	
10	Jordan (JOR)	3:36.73	
11	Fiji (FIJ)	3:39.59	
12	Qatar (QAT)	3:43.32	
13	Pakistan (PAK)	4:01.87	
—	South Korea (KOR)	DSQ	
—	Tajikistan (TJK)	DNS	

==== 4 × 50 m medley relay ====
22 September

Rank	Team	Heats	Final
1st place, gold medalist(s)	South Korea (KOR)	1:37.72	1:35.28
2nd place, silver medalist(s)	China (CHN)	1:37.35	1:35.91
3rd place, bronze medalist(s)	Kazakhstan (KAZ)	1:38.10	1:37.01
4	Iran (IRI)	1:40.52	1:38.76
5	Chinese Taipei (TPE)	1:40.89	1:39.26
6	Hong Kong (HKG)	1:39.68	1:39.40
7	Vietnam (VIE)	1:41.47	1:41.26
—	Thailand (THA)	1:40.45	DSQ
9	Uzbekistan (UZB)	1:41.55	
10	Macau (MAC)	1:43.46	
11	Turkmenistan (TKM)	1:44.90	
12	Fiji (FIJ)	1:45.92	
13	Jordan (JOR)	1:46.91	
14	Qatar (QAT)	1:50.98	
15	Saudi Arabia (KSA)	1:52.13	
16	Pakistan (PAK)	1:55.92	

==== 4 × 100 m medley relay ====
25 September

Rank	Team	Heats	Final
1st place, gold medalist(s)	China (CHN)	3:41.44	3:29.75
2nd place, silver medalist(s)	South Korea (KOR)	3:36.40	3:31.76
3rd place, bronze medalist(s)	Kazakhstan (KAZ)	3:38.17	3:33.83
4	Chinese Taipei (TPE)	3:46.46	3:38.27
5	Iran (IRI)	3:40.87	3:38.38
6	Hong Kong (HKG)	3:42.21	3:38.96
7	Vietnam (VIE)	3:45.24	3:42.27
—	Turkmenistan (TKM)	3:54.50	DNS
9	Jordan (JOR)	3:58.74	
10	Fiji (FIJ)	4:00.21	
11	Thailand (THA)	4:02.34	
12	Saudi Arabia (KSA)	4:09.39	
13	Pakistan (PAK)	4:14.00	
—	Qatar (QAT)	DNS	
—	Uzbekistan (UZB)	DNS	

=== Women ===
==== 50 m freestyle ====
22 September

Rank	Athlete	Heats	Final
1st place, gold medalist(s)	Jenjira Srisa-ard (THA)	25.30	24.71
2nd place, silver medalist(s)	Lao Lihui (CHN)	25.20	24.99
3rd place, bronze medalist(s)	Natthanan Junkrajang (THA)	25.61	25.38
4	Elmira Ibraim (KAZ)	25.92	25.63
5	Feng Ling (CHN)	25.74	25.65
6	Chan Kin Lok (HKG)	25.84	25.70
6	Tam Hoi Lam (HKG)	26.15	25.70
8	Talita Baqlah (JOR)	25.98	25.97
9	Lei On Kei (MAC)	26.31	
10	Matelita Buadromo (FIJ)	26.43	
11	Shivani Kataria (IND)	27.19	
12	Adi Kinisimere Naivalu (FIJ)	27.32	
13	Choi Weng Tong (MAC)	27.84	
14	Kirsten Fisher-Marsters (COK)	27.93	
15	Ann-Marie Hepler (MHL)	28.02	
16	Bisma Khan (PAK)	28.23	
17	Colleen Furgeson (MHL)	28.43	
18	Charissa Panuve (TGA)	29.22	
19	Mishael Aisha Ayub (PAK)	29.27	
20	Yasmine Bedour (JOR)	29.31	
21	Keýik Weliýewa (TKM)	29.36	
22	Mineri Gomez (GUM)	29.46	
23	Jourdyn Adams (FSM)	30.01	
24	Anastasiya Tyurina (TJK)	30.02	
25	Amanda Poppe (GUM)	30.21	
26	Noelani Day (TGA)	30.22	
27	Osisang Chilton (PLW)	30.35	
28	Roylin Akiwo (PLW)	30.37	
29	Anastasiýa Morgenstern (TKM)	30.46	
30	Aminath Shajan (MDV)	30.50	
31	Aishath Sausan (MDV)	31.23	
32	Taeyanna Adams (FSM)	31.32	
33	Dania Nour (PLE)	32.69	
34	Imelda Ximenes Belo (TLS)	34.36	
35	Anisa Dzhuraeva (TJK)	39.52	

==== 100 m freestyle ====
25 September

Rank	Athlete	Heats	Final
1st place, gold medalist(s)	Sun Meichen (CHN)	55.59	53.31
2nd place, silver medalist(s)	Sze Hang Yu (HKG)	55.35	54.21
3rd place, bronze medalist(s)	Lao Lihui (CHN)	54.96	54.55
4	Natthanan Junkrajang (THA)	56.62	55.62
5	Diana Nazarova (KAZ)	58.13	56.98
6	Shivani Kataria (IND)	57.53	57.24
7	Matelita Buadromo (FIJ)	57.42	57.38
8	Wong Cho Ying (HKG)	57.87	57.88
9	Tan Chi Yan (MAC)	58.34	
10	Adi Kinisimere Naivalu (FIJ)	59.59	
11	Talita Baqlah (JOR)	59.73	
12	Elmira Ibraim (KAZ)	1:00.78	
13	Damini Gowda (IND)	1:00.90	
14	Choi Weng Tong (MAC)	1:01.04	
15	Leedia Al-Safadi (JOR)	1:01.97	
16	Bisma Khan (PAK)	1:02.87	
17	Mineri Gomez (GUM)	1:03.30	
18	Mishael Aisha Ayub (PAK)	1:03.67	
19	Ann-Marie Hepler (MHL)	1:03.85	
20	Charissa Panuve (TGA)	1:04.05	
21	Keýik Weliýewa (TKM)	1:04.53	
22	Osisang Chilton (PLW)	1:05.09	
23	Amanda Poppe (GUM)	1:05.11	
24	Jourdyn Adams (FSM)	1:06.85	
25	Anastasiya Tyurina (TJK)	1:07.21	
26	Anastasiýa Morgenstern (TKM)	1:07.31	
27	Roylin Akiwo (PLW)	1:09.09	
28	Aminath Shajan (MDV)	1:09.96	
29	Dania Nour (PLE)	1:10.45	
30	Imelda Ximenes Belo (TLS)	1:14.90	

==== 200 m freestyle ====
24 September

Rank	Athlete	Heats	Final
1st place, gold medalist(s)	Sun Meichen (CHN)	2:02.61	1:55.57
2nd place, silver medalist(s)	Nguyễn Thị Ánh Viên (VIE)	2:02.52	1:56.06
3rd place, bronze medalist(s)	Tinky Ho (HKG)	2:01.31	1:58.03
4	Natthanan Junkrajang (THA)	2:02.55	1:58.49
5	Zhang Chenyao (CHN)	2:00.83	1:58.57
6	Katii Tang (HKG)	2:01.80	2:01.50
7	Alexandra Shatskikh (KAZ)	2:03.59	2:02.81
8	Matelita Buadromo (FIJ)	2:04.93	2:04.95
9	Shivani Kataria (IND)	2:05.45	
10	Tan Chi Yan (MAC)	2:09.07	
11	Long Chi Wai (MAC)	2:12.69	
12	Osisang Chilton (PLW)	2:22.42	
13	Dania Nour (PLE)	2:35.94	
—	Leedia Al-Safadi (JOR)	DNS	

==== 50 m backstroke ====
23 September

Rank	Athlete	Heats	Final
1st place, gold medalist(s)	Yang Yifan (CHN)	27.81	27.37
2nd place, silver medalist(s)	Toto Wong (HKG)	27.95	27.80
3rd place, bronze medalist(s)	Jiang Yuru (CHN)	28.19	27.98
4	Diana Nazarova (KAZ)	28.78	28.80
5	Erica Lau (HKG)	29.32	28.97
6	Adi Kinisimere Naivalu (FIJ)	30.33	29.96
7	Jyotsna Pansare (IND)	30.15	30.18
8	Juthamas Sutthison (THA)	30.73	33.47
9	Bisma Khan (PAK)	31.31	
10	Colleen Furgeson (MHL)	32.05	
11	Leedia Al-Safadi (JOR)	32.72	
12	Darýa Semýonowa (TKM)	32.83	
13	Pusanisa Sangplong (THA)	32.87	
14	Osisang Chilton (PLW)	33.80	
15	Aishath Sausan (MDV)	34.02	
16	Eneş Begmyradowa (TKM)	34.24	
17	Charissa Panuve (TGA)	34.38	
18	Yasmine Bedour (JOR)	34.39	
19	Roylin Akiwo (PLW)	34.61	
20	Amanda Poppe (GUM)	34.67	
21	Jehanara Nabi (PAK)	35.18	
22	Noelani Day (TGA)	36.83	

==== 100 m backstroke ====
24 September

Rank	Athlete	Heats	Final
1st place, gold medalist(s)	Stephanie Au (HKG)	1:03.08	58.94
2nd place, silver medalist(s)	Yang Yifan (CHN)	1:01.27	59.16
3rd place, bronze medalist(s)	Jiang Yuru (CHN)	1:02.48	59.25
4	Nguyễn Thị Ánh Viên (VIE)	1:01.60	59.42
5	Toto Wong (HKG)	1:02.46	59.51
6	Diana Nazarova (KAZ)	1:01.63	1:01.04
7	Juthamas Sutthison (THA)	1:07.04	1:04.38
8	Leedia Al-Safadi (JOR)	1:09.62	1:09.06
9	Colleen Furgeson (MHL)	1:09.71	
10	Osisang Chilton (PLW)	1:14.54	
11	Eneş Begmyradowa (TKM)	1:14.75	
12	Roylin Akiwo (PLW)	1:14.93	
13	Yasmine Bedour (JOR)	1:15.29	
14	Amanda Poppe (GUM)	1:16.35	
15	Aishath Sausan (MDV)	1:17.89	
16	Jehanara Nabi (PAK)	1:18.58	

==== 50 m breaststroke ====
25 September

Rank	Athlete	Heats	Final
1st place, gold medalist(s)	Kim Dal-eun (KOR)	31.01	30.88
2nd place, silver medalist(s)	Jenjira Srisa-ard (THA)	31.58	31.02
3rd place, bronze medalist(s)	Yvette Kong (HKG)	32.00	31.32
4	Rainbow Ip (HKG)	32.35	31.72
5	Lei On Kei (MAC)	32.00	31.95
6	Adelaida Pchelintseva (KAZ)	32.87	32.21
7	Lao Lihui (CHN)	33.41	33.17
8	Kirsten Fisher-Marsters (COK)	33.70	33.98
9	Chavunnooch Salubluek (THA)	33.70	
10	Chahat Arora (IND)	33.95	
11	Darýa Semýonowa (TKM)	34.76	
12	Cheng Wanting (CHN)	35.08	
13	Colleen Furgeson (MHL)	37.14	
14	Karina Klimyk (TJK)	38.13	
15	Ramsha Imran (PAK)	38.18	
16	Yasmine Bedour (JOR)	38.41	
17	Leedia Al-Safadi (JOR)	39.30	
18	Niharika Tuladhar (NEP)	39.31	
19	Taeyanna Adams (FSM)	39.52	
20	Aishath Sajina (MDV)	40.25	
21	Jourdyn Adams (FSM)	40.89	
22	Noelani Day (TGA)	41.91	
23	Anisa Dzhuraeva (TJK)	54.76	

==== 100 m breaststroke ====
22 September

Rank	Athlete	Heats	Final
1st place, gold medalist(s)	Kim Dal-eun (KOR)	1:08.54	1:07.51
2nd place, silver medalist(s)	Rainbow Ip (HKG)	1:09.83	1:07.84
3rd place, bronze medalist(s)	Natalie Kan (HKG)	1:10.61	1:09.19
4	Lao Lihui (CHN)	1:11.65	1:09.86
5	Lei On Kei (MAC)	1:11.08	1:10.10
6	Adelaida Pchelintseva (KAZ)	1:13.90	1:10.87
7	Chavunnooch Salubluek (THA)	1:11.70	1:10.88
8	Cheng Wanting (CHN)	1:13.75	1:14.36
9	Darýa Semýonowa (TKM)	1:14.17	
10	Kirsten Fisher-Marsters (COK)	1:14.75	
11	Chahat Arora (IND)	1:16.48	
12	Leedia Al-Safadi (JOR)	1:22.95	
13	Yasmine Bedour (JOR)	1:23.77	
14	Ramsha Imran (PAK)	1:24.51	
15	Colleen Furgeson (MHL)	1:25.15	
16	Aishath Sajina (MDV)	1:27.53	
17	Niharika Tuladhar (NEP)	1:27.86	
18	Taeyanna Adams (FSM)	1:30.71	

==== 50 m butterfly ====
24 September

Rank	Athlete	Heats	Final
1st place, gold medalist(s)	Jenjira Srisa-ard (THA)	26.99	26.18
2nd place, silver medalist(s)	Park Ye-rin (KOR)	26.67	26.33
3rd place, bronze medalist(s)	Chan Kin Lok (HKG)	27.54	26.74
4	Wong Yuk Yan (HKG)	27.05	26.78
5	Yu Liyan (CHN)	27.52	27.38
6	Elmira Ibraim (KAZ)	27.57	27.45
7	Talita Baqlah (JOR)	28.36	27.99
8	Supasuta Sounthornchote (THA)	28.52	28.14
9	Matelita Buadromo (FIJ)	28.75	
10	Jyotsna Pansare (IND)	28.92	
11	Ann-Marie Hepler (MHL)	29.20	
12	Min Yiwei (CHN)	29.53	
13	Long Chi Wai (MAC)	29.71	
14	Damini Gowda (IND)	29.80	
15	Adi Kinisimere Naivalu (FIJ)	30.02	
16	Bisma Khan (PAK)	30.72	
17	Mishael Aisha Ayub (PAK)	31.12	
18	Charissa Panuve (TGA)	31.14	
19	Keýik Weliýewa (TKM)	31.25	
20	Lara Aklouk (JOR)	31.40	
21	Mineri Gomez (GUM)	31.44	
22	Aminath Shajan (MDV)	33.56	
23	Anastasiya Tyurina (TJK)	33.87	
24	Roylin Akiwo (PLW)	34.13	
25	Karina Klimyk (TJK)	34.19	
26	Aishath Sausan (MDV)	34.31	
27	Noelani Day (TGA)	36.42	

==== 100 m butterfly ====
23 September

Rank	Athlete	Heats	Final
1st place, gold medalist(s)	Chan Kin Lok (HKG)	1:01.15	58.15
2nd place, silver medalist(s)	Sun Meichen (CHN)	1:00.40	58.25
3rd place, bronze medalist(s)	Park Ye-rin (KOR)	59.07	58.40
4	Elmira Ibraim (KAZ)	1:00.94	59.51
5	Tam Hoi Lam (HKG)	1:02.19	59.99
6	Matelita Buadromo (FIJ)	1:02.34	1:03.53
7	Min Yiwei (CHN)	1:04.09	1:03.68
8	Jyotsna Pansare (IND)	1:04.18	1:03.86
9	Damini Gowda (IND)	1:04.42	
10	Lara Aklouk (JOR)	1:07.91	
11	Mishael Aisha Ayub (PAK)	1:08.36	
12	Ann-Marie Hepler (MHL)	1:10.49	
13	Charissa Panuve (TGA)	1:11.51	
14	Mineri Gomez (GUM)	1:13.32	
15	Aminath Shajan (MDV)	1:24.81	

==== 100 m individual medley ====
25 September

Rank	Athlete	Heats	Final
1st place, gold medalist(s)	Nguyễn Thị Ánh Viên (VIE)	1:01.68	1:00.68
2nd place, silver medalist(s)	Zhang Chenyao (CHN)	1:02.15	1:00.91
3rd place, bronze medalist(s)	Qian Xinan (CHN)	1:02.90	1:01.77
4	Chan Kin Lok (HKG)	1:06.92	1:01.93
5	Natalie Kan (HKG)	1:05.65	1:02.10
6	Alexandra Shatskikh (KAZ)	1:05.30	1:05.17
7	Jyotsna Pansare (IND)	1:08.87	1:07.95
—	Bisma Khan (PAK)	1:12.13	DNS
9	Matelita Buadromo (FIJ)	1:05.48	
10	Colleen Furgeson (MHL)	1:12.27	
11	Lara Aklouk (JOR)	1:13.68	
12	Ann-Marie Hepler (MHL)	1:13.87	
13	Charissa Panuve (TGA)	1:15.37	
14	Osisang Chilton (PLW)	1:15.61	
15	Karina Klimyk (TJK)	1:16.73	
16	Jehanara Nabi (PAK)	1:19.39	
17	Aishath Sausan (MDV)	1:19.95	
18	Roylin Akiwo (PLW)	1:21.59	
19	Noelani Day (TGA)	1:21.64	
20	Aishath Sajina (MDV)	1:22.54	

==== 200 m individual medley ====
22 September

Rank	Athlete	Heats	Final
1st place, gold medalist(s)	Nguyễn Thị Ánh Viên (VIE)	2:11.11	2:09.78
2nd place, silver medalist(s)	Zhang Chenyao (CHN)	2:11.90	2:12.67
3rd place, bronze medalist(s)	Qian Xinan (CHN)	2:16.44	2:13.93
4	Alexandra Shatskikh (KAZ)	2:19.18	2:14.37
5	Natalie Kan (HKG)	2:23.48	2:17.70
6	Matelita Buadromo (FIJ)	2:19.43	2:19.19
7	Wong Cho Ying (HKG)	2:20.97	2:22.38
8	Lara Aklouk (JOR)	2:35.59	2:35.63
9	Osisang Chilton (PLW)	2:46.92	
10	Roylin Akiwo (PLW)	2:57.86	

==== 4 × 50 m freestyle relay ====
24 September

Rank	Team	Final
1st place, gold medalist(s)	China (CHN)	1:40.16
2nd place, silver medalist(s)	Hong Kong (HKG)	1:40.26
3rd place, bronze medalist(s)	Thailand (THA)	1:41.16
4	Macau (MAC)	1:45.63
5	Kazakhstan (KAZ)	1:46.63
6	Jordan (JOR)	1:54.80
7	Pakistan (PAK)	1:57.17
8	Turkmenistan (TKM)	1:57.59

==== 4 × 100 m freestyle relay ====
23 September

Rank	Team	Final
1st place, gold medalist(s)	China (CHN)	3:37.94
2nd place, silver medalist(s)	Hong Kong (HKG)	3:40.18
3rd place, bronze medalist(s)	Thailand (THA)	3:45.83
4	Kazakhstan (KAZ)	3:51.66
5	Macau (MAC)	3:53.65
6	Jordan (JOR)	4:11.81
7	Pakistan (PAK)	4:21.06
8	Turkmenistan (TKM)	4:22.42

==== 4 × 50 m medley relay ====
22 September

Rank	Team	Heats	Final
1st place, gold medalist(s)	Hong Kong (HKG)	1:55.03	1:48.79
2nd place, silver medalist(s)	China (CHN)	1:52.52	1:51.64
2nd place, silver medalist(s)	Thailand (THA)	1:56.63	1:51.64
4	Kazakhstan (KAZ)	1:55.68	1:53.43
5	Macau (MAC)	2:01.58	1:59.28
6	India (IND)	2:01.09	2:00.01
7	Turkmenistan (TKM)	2:10.33	2:08.98
8	Jordan (JOR)	2:10.23	2:11.17
9	Pakistan (PAK)	2:11.78	

==== 4 × 100 m medley relay ====
25 September

Rank	Team	Final
1st place, gold medalist(s)	Hong Kong (HKG)	3:58.32
2nd place, silver medalist(s)	China (CHN)	4:04.46
3rd place, bronze medalist(s)	Thailand (THA)	4:09.30
4	Kazakhstan (KAZ)	4:12.00
5	India (IND)	4:24.58
6	Jordan (JOR)	4:45.67
7	Pakistan (PAK)	4:50.30
8	Turkmenistan (TKM)	4:52.78
