= List of Kazakhstani records in swimming =

The Kazakhstani records in swimming are the fastest ever performances of swimmers from Kazakhstan, which are recognised and ratified by the Swimming Federation of the Republic of Kazakhstan.

All records were set in finals unless noted otherwise.

== Long Course (50 m) ==
=== Men ===
Event	Time		Name	Club	Date	Meet	Location	Ref
50 m freestyle	22.05	sf	Gleb Kovalenya	AKO	8 May 2026	Kazakhstani Championships	Taldykorgan, Kazakhstan	
100 m freestyle	49.10		Adilbek Mussin	Kazakhstan	24 September 2023	Asian Games	Hangzhou, China	
200 m freestyle	1:50.16		Alexandr Ivanov	Kazakhstan	11 August 2009	Asian Age Group Championships	Tokyo, Japan	
400 m freestyle	3:53.25		Alexandr Ivanov	Kazakhstan	10 August 2009	Asian Age Group Championships	Tokyo, Japan	
800 m freestyle	8:09.21		Renat Dauranov	-	1988	-	Moscow, Soviet Union	
1500 m freestyle	15:27.79		Renat Dauranov	-	July 1988	USSR Championships	Moscow, Soviet Union	
50 m backstroke	25.43	sf	Gleb Kovalenya	AKO	6 May 2026	Kazakhstani Championships	Taldykorgan, Kazakhstan	
100 m backstroke	54.85	r	Alexandr Tarabrin	Kazakhstan	19 May 2012	Kazakhstan Open Cup	Temirtau, Kazakhstan	
200 m backstroke	1:59.95		Alexandr Tarabrin	Kazakhstan	March 2013	Ukrainian Open Championships	Dnipropetrovsk, Ukraine	
50 m breaststroke	27.24	sf	Dmitriy Balandin	Kazakhstan	4 August 2015	World Championships	Kazan, Russia	
100 m breaststroke	59.03	sf	Dmitriy Balandin	Kazakhstan	21 July 2019	World Championships	Gwangju, South Korea	
200 m breaststroke	2:07.46		Dmitriy Balandin	Kazakhstan	10 August 2016	Olympic Games	Rio de Janeiro, Brazil	
50m butterfly	23.33	h	Adilbek Mussin	Kazakhstan	27 July 2025	World Championships	Singapore, Singapore	
100m butterfly	51.68	h	Adilbek Mussin	Kazakhstan	28 July 2023	World Championships	Fukuoka, Japan	
200m butterfly	1:58.58	h	Adilbek Mussin	Kazakhstan	23 July 2019	World Championships	Gwangju, South Korea	
200m individual medley	2:00.37		Aibat Myrzamuratov	Kazakhstan	20 September 2026	Asian Games	Tokyo, Japan	
400m individual medley	4:20.52		Dmitriy Gordiyenko	Kazakhstan	12 August 2009	Asian Age Group Championships	Tokyo, Japan	
4×100m freestyle relay	3:17.86		Adilbek Mussin (50.34); Maxim Klimenko (49.81); Gleb Kovalenya (48.66); Aibat Myrzamuratov (49.05)	Kazakhstan	24 September 2026	Asian Games	Tokyo, Japan	
4×200m freestyle relay	7:29.45		Alexandr Ivanov (1:51.20); Dmitriy Gordiyenko (1:51.83); Oleg Rabota (1:50.85); Artur Dilman (1:55.57)	Kazakhstan	13 August 2009	Asian Age Group Championships	Tokyo, Japan	
4×100m medley relay	3:35.62		Adil Kaskabay (55.53); Dmitriy Balandin (58.88); Adilbek Mussin (52.44); Alexandr Varakin (48.77)	Kazakhstan	24 August 2018	Asian Games	Jakarta, Indonesia	

Legend: # – Record awaiting ratification by Swimming Federation of the Republic of Kazakhstan; WR – World record; AS – Asian record; e – equalled existing record;
Records not set in finals: h – heat; sf – semifinal; r – relay 1st leg; rh – relay heat 1st leg; b – B final; † – en route to final mark; so – swim-off; tt – time trial

=== Women ===
Event	Time		Name	Club	Date	Meet	Location	Ref
50 m freestyle	25.15		Yevgeniya Yermakova	-	16 October 1999	-	Almaty, Kazakhstan	
100 m freestyle	55.89	h	Elmira Aigaliyeva	Kazakhstan	1 August 2013	World Championships	Barcelona, Spain	
200 m freestyle	2:01.75	r	Elmira Aigaliyeva	Jambyl Region	20 May 2012	Kazakhstan Open Cup	Temirtau, Kazakhstan	
400 m freestyle	4:13.47		Diana Taszhanova	Kazakhstan	26 September 2023	Asian Games	Hangzhou, China	
800 m freestyle	8:48.46		Diana Taszhanova	Kazakhstan	29 September 2023	Asian Games	Hangzhou, China	
1500 m freestyle	17:06.31		Diana Taszhanova	Kazakhstan	27 February 2024	Asian Age Group Championships	New Clark City, Philippines	
50m backstroke	28.04		Yekaterina Rudenko	Kazakhstan	23 September 2014	Asian Games	Incheon, South Korea	
100m backstroke	1:00.42		Yekaterina Rudenko	Kazakhstan	20 April 2016	Belarusian Open Championships	Brest, Belarus	
200m backstroke	2:12.82		Xeniya Ignatova	Kazakhstan	26 September 2023	Asian Games	Hangzhou, China	
50m breaststroke	31.04		Adelaida Pchelintseva	Kazakhstan	24 September 2023	Asian Games	Hangzhou, China	
100m breaststroke	1:09.05	h	Yekaterina Sadovnik	Kazakhstan	27 July 2009	World Championships	Rome, Italy	
200m breaststroke	2:29.77		Yekaterina Sadovnik	Kazakhstan	12 August 2009	Asian Age Group Championships	Tokyo, Japan	
50m butterfly	26.10		Sofia Spodarenko	Turkistan Oblast	30 March 2023	Kazakhstani Championships	Taldykorgan, Kazakhstan	
100m butterfly	59.40		Elmira Aigaliyeva	Kazakhstan	14 April 2013	Turkish Open Championships	Istanbul, Turkey	
200m butterfly	2:15.42		Elmira Aigaliyeva	Kazakhstan	26 March 2013	-	Istanbul, Turkey	
200m individual medley	2:14.94	h	Xeniya Ignatova	Kazakhstan	21 September 2026	Asian Games	Tokyo, Japan	
400m individual medley	4:53.30		Marina Ufimtseva	-	1983	-	Almaty, Soviet Union	
4×100m freestyle relay	3:51.70		Yana Lukyanchikova (58.03); Aizhan Turebaeva (58.56); Taisia Korotkova (58.69); Sofia Spodarenko (56.42)	Kazakhstan	12 April 2026	Belarusian Championships	Minsk, Belarus	
4×200m freestyle relay	8:35.40		Diana Nazarova (2:09.14); Diana Zlobina (2:06.89); Diana Taszhanova (2:08.06); Aida Almubat (2:11.31)	Aktobe	7 June 2019	Spartakiad of the Republic of Kazakhstan	Aktobe, Kazakhstan	
4×100m medley relay	4:10.78		Xeniya Ignatova (1:02.23); Adelaida Pchelintseva (1:10.67); Sofia Spodarenko (59.24); Diana Taszhanova (58.64)	Kazakhstan	28 February 2024	Asian Age Group Championships	New Clark City, Philippines	

Legend: # – Record awaiting ratification by Swimming Federation of the Republic of Kazakhstan; WR – World record; AS – Asian record; e – equalled existing record;
Records not set in finals: h – heat; sf – semifinal; r – relay 1st leg; rh – relay heat 1st leg; b – B final; † – en route to final mark; so – swim-off; tt – time trial

=== Mixed relay ===
Event	Time		Name	Club	Date	Meet	Location	Ref
4×100 m freestyle relay	3:38.84	h	Yegor Popov (51.72); Daniil Cherepanov (50.96); Xeniya Ignatova (58.14); Sofiya Abubakirova (58.02)	Kazakhstan	6 September 2023	World Junior Championships	Netanya, Israel	
4×100 m medley relay	3:49.19		Xeniya Ignatova (1:01.61); Aibat Myrzamuratov (59.69); Maxim Skazobtsov (51.93); Sofia Spodarenko (55.96)	Kazakhstan	23 September 2026	Asian Games	Tokyo, Japan	

Legend: # – Record awaiting ratification by Swimming Federation of the Republic of Kazakhstan; WR – World record; AS – Asian record; e – equalled existing record;
Records not set in finals: h – heat; so – swim-off

== Short Course (25 m) ==
=== Men ===
Event	Time		Name	Club	Date	Meet	Location	Ref
50m freestyle	21.71	sf	Gleb Kovalenya	AKO	8 November 2024	Kazakhstani Championships	Almaty, Kazakhstan	
100m freestyle	47.63		Adil Kaskabay	Kazakhstan	25 September 2017	Asian Indoor and Martial Arts Games	Ashgabat, Turkmenistan	
200m freestyle	1:45.68		Galymzhan Balabek	Kazakhstan	23 November 2025	Strongest Athletes Cup	Minsk, Belarus	
400m freestyle	3:46.87		Galymzhan Balabek	Kazakhstan	16 October 2026	World Cup	Astana, Kazakhstan	
800m freestyle	7:56.52		Galymzhan Balabek	Kazakhstan	8 November 2026	Belarusian Championships	Minsk, Belarus	
1500m freestyle	15:11.30		Rinat Dauranov	-	1998	-	Moscow, Russia	
50m backstroke	23.93	r	Alexandr Tarabrin	Kazakhstan	30 June 2013	Asian Indoor and Martial Arts Games	Incheon, South Korea	
100m backstroke	50.75		Alexandr Tarabrin	Kazakhstan	2 July 2013	Asian Indoor and Martial Arts Games	Incheon, South Korea	
200m backstroke	1:52.74	h	Alexandr Tarabrin	Kazakhstan	16 December 2012	World Championships	Istanbul, Turkey	
50m breaststroke	26.50		Aibat Myrzamuratov	Kazakhstan	15 October 2026	World Cup	Astana, Kazakhstan	
100m breaststroke	57.68		Vladislav Polyakov	Kazakhstan	11 November 2009	World Cup	Stockholm, Sweden	
200m breaststroke	2:05.02		Vladislav Polyakov	Kazakhstan	10 November 2009	World Cup	Stockholm, Sweden	
50m butterfly	22.89		Adilbek Mussin	-	5 December 2023	Kazakhstani Cup	Taldykorgan, Kazakhstan	
100m butterfly	50.55	h	Adilbek Mussin	Kazakhstan	13 December 2024	World Championships	Budapest, Hungary	
200m butterfly	1:54.40	h	Adilbek Mussin	Kazakhstan	16 December 2021	World Championships	Abu Dhabi, United Arab Emirates	
100m individual medley	54.00		Yegor Popov	Kazakhstan	1 October 2026	World Cup	Baku, Azerbaijan	
200m individual medley	1:57.50		Dmitriy Gordiyenko	Kazakhstan	4 November 2009	Asian Indoor Games	Hanoi, Vietnam	
400m individual medley	4:18.14		Maksim Skazobtsov	SHM	8 November 2024	Kazakhstani Championships	Almaty, Kazakhstan	
4×50m freestyle relay	1:28.99		Adil Kaskabay (21.92); Adilbek Mussin (22.03); Aibek Kamzenov (22.95); Roman Trussov (22.09)	Kazakhstan	24 September 2017	Asian Indoor and Martial Arts Games	Ashgabat, Turkmenistan	
4×100m freestyle relay	3:15.97	h	Adilbek Mussin (48.48); Yegor Popov (49.18); Maxim Skazobtsov (50.13); Gleb Kovalenya (48.18)	Kazakhstan	10 December 2024	World Championships	Budapest, Hungary	
4×200m freestyle relay	7:27.58		Aleksey Kruchenko (1:49.70); Aleksandr Rumynskiy (1:54.72); Danil Chuzhinov (1:54.60); Elaman Bibulaev (1:48.56)	Almaty	7 November 2024	Kazakhstani Championships	Almaty, Kazakhstan	
4×50m medley relay	1:36.55		Alexandr Tarabrin (23.93); Roman Trussov; Stanislav Kuzmin; Yevgeniy Azaryev	Kazakhstan	30 June 2013	Asian Indoor and Martial Arts Games	Incheon, South Korea	
4×100m medley relay	3:29.47	h	Yegor Popov (53.62); Arsen Kozhakhmetov (57.91); Adilbek Mussin (50.21); Gleb Kovalenya (47.73)	Kazakhstan	15 December 2024	World Championships	Budapest, Hungary	

Legend: # – Record awaiting ratification by Swimming Federation of the Republic of Kazakhstan; WR – World record; AS – Asian record; e – equalled existing record;
Records not set in finals: h – heat; sf – semifinal; r – relay 1st leg; rh – relay heat 1st leg; b – B final; † – en route to final mark; so – swim-off; tt – time trial

=== Women ===
Event	Time		Name	Club	Date	Meet	Location	Ref
50 m freestyle	25.13		Yevgenia Ermakova	Kazakhstan	9 February 2000	World Cup	Imperia, Italy	
100 m freestyle	54.66		Yevgenia Ermakova	Kazakhstan	13 February 2000	World Cup	Paris, France	
200 m freestyle	1:58.78		Xeniya Ignatova	-	5 December 2023	Kazakhstani Cup	Taldykorgan, Kazakhstan	
400 m freestyle	4:15.59	h	Diana Taszhanova	Kazakhstan	17 December 2022	Vladimir Salnikov Cup	Saint Petersburg, Russia	
800 m freestyle	8:48.91		Diana Zlobina	Aktobe Region	27 October 2017	Kazakhstani Championships	Temirtau, Kazakhstan	
1500 m freestyle	16:54.41		Diana Taszhanova	Kazakhstan	18 December 2022	Vladimir Salnikov Cup	Saint Petersburg, Russia	
50m backstroke	27.26	h	Yekaterina Rudenko	Kazakhstan	6 December 2014	World Championships	Doha, Qatar	
100m backstroke	58.44	h	Yekaterina Rudenko	Kazakhstan	3 December 2014	World Championships	Doha, Qatar	
200m backstroke	2:06.45		Xeniya Ignatova	-	9 November 2023	Kazakhstani Championships	Taldykorgan, Kazakhstan	
50m breaststroke	30.36	h	Adelaida Pchelintseva	Kazakhstan	14 December 2024	World Championships	Budapest, Hungary	
100m breaststroke	1:07.74	h, =	Adelaida Pchelintseva	Kazakhstan	1 November 2024	World Cup	Singapore, Singapore	
100m breaststroke	1:07.74	h, =	Adelaida Pchelintseva	Kazakhstan	11 December 2024	World Championships	Budapest, Hungary	
200m breaststroke	2:31.66		Aizada Zhusupova	Pavlodar	20 February 2013	Kazakhstani Championships	Temirtau, Kazakhstan	
50m butterfly	25.97	h	Sofia Spodarenko	Kazakhstan	15 October 2026	World Cup	Astana, Kazakhstan	
100m butterfly	58.40		Elmira Aigaliyeva	Kazakhstan	1 July 2013	Asian Indoor and Martial Arts Games	Incheon, South Korea	
200m butterfly	2:14.14	h	Diana Taszhanova	Kazakhstan	16 December 2022	Vladimir Salnikov Cup	Saint Petersburg, Russia	
100m individual medley	1:01.29		Elmira Aigaliyeva	Kazakhstan	3 July 2013	Asian Indoor and Martial Arts Games	Incheon, South Korea	
200m individual medley	2:13.62		Xeniya Ignatova	KGO1	17 November 2024	Kazakhstani Cup	Almaty, Kazakhstan	
400m individual medley	4:46.53		Alexandra Shatskikh	Kazakhstan	30 December 2016	Israel Winter Championship	Netanya, Israel	
4×50m freestyle relay	1:43.60		Elmira Aigaliyeva (25.53); Yekaterina Russova; Yekaterina Rudenko; Aizada Zhussupova	Kazakhstan	2 July 2013	Asian Indoor and Martial Arts Games	Incheon, South Korea	
4×100m freestyle relay	3:51.66		Diana Nazarova (57.43); Alexandra Shatskikh (57.66); Adelaida Pchelintseva (1:00.50); Elmira Ibraim (56.07)	Kazakhstan	23 September 2017	Asian Indoor and Martial Arts Games	Ashgabat, Turkmenistan	
4×200m freestyle relay	8:26.32			-	November 2025	Kazakhstani Championships	Almaty, Kazakhstan	
4×50m medley relay	1:52.83		Yekaterina Rudenko (27.88); Aizada Zhussupova; Elmira Aigaliyeva; Yekaterina Russova	Kazakhstan	30 June 2013	Asian Indoor and Martial Arts Games	Incheon, South Korea	
4×100m medley relay	4:01.48		Xeniya Ignatova; Adelaida Pchelintseva; Sofia Spodarenko; Sofia Abubakirova	Kazakhstan	19 November 2024	Kazakhstani Cup	Almaty, Kazakhstan	

Legend: # – Record awaiting ratification by Swimming Federation of the Republic of Kazakhstan; WR – World record; AS – Asian record; e – equalled existing record;
Records not set in finals: h – heat; sf – semifinal; r – relay 1st leg; rh – relay heat 1st leg; b – B final; † – en route to final mark; so – swim-off; tt – time trial

=== Mixed relay ===
Event	Time		Name	Club	Date	Meet	Location	Ref
4×50 m freestyle relay								
4×100 m freestyle relay	3:34.08		Adilbek Mussin; Xeniya Ignatova	-	27 December 2021			
4×50 m medley relay	1:42.20	h	Xeniya Ignatova (27.84); Adelaida Pchelintseva (30.22); Adilbek Mussin (22.56); Gleb Kovalenya (21.58)	Kazakhstan	11 December 2024	World Championships	Budapest, Hungary	
4×100 m medley relay	3:42.81	h	Xeniya Ignatova (59.34); Arsen Kozhakhmetov (58.00); Adilbek Mussin (50.15); Sofia Spodarenko (55.32)	Kazakhstan	14 December 2024	World Championships	Budapest, Hungary	

Legend: # – Record awaiting ratification by Swimming Federation of the Republic of Kazakhstan; WR – World record; AS – Asian record; e – equalled existing record;
Records not set in finals: h – heat; sf – semifinal; r – relay 1st leg; rh – relay heat 1st leg; b – B final; † – en route to final mark; so – swim-off; tt – time trial
