= List of Asian Indoor and Martial Arts Games records in swimming =

The fastest times in the swimming events at the Asian Indoor and Martial Arts Games are designated as the AIMAG records in swimming. The events are held in a short course (25 m) pool. All records were set in finals unless noted otherwise.

== Men ==
Event	Time	Name	Nationality	Date	Meet	Location	Ref
50m freestyle	21.83	Yang Jung-doo	South Korea	30 June 2013	2013 AIMAG	Incheon, South Korea	
100m freestyle	47.63	Adil Kaskabay	Kazakhstan	25 September 2017	2017 AIMAG	Ashgabat, Turkmenistan	
200m freestyle	1:44.54	Mao Feilian	China	2 July 2013	2013 AIMAG	Incheon, South Korea	
50m backstroke	23.22	Jeong Dong-won	South Korea	23 September 2017	2017 AIMAG	Ashgabat, Turkmenistan	
100m backstroke	50.75	Alexandr Tarabrin	Kazakhstan	2 July 2013	2013 AIMAG	Incheon, South Korea	
50m breaststroke	26.65	Wang Lizhuo	China	23 September 2017	2017 AIMAG	Ashgabat, Turkmenistan	
100m breaststroke	57.02	Wang Lizhuo	China	22 September 2017	2017 AIMAG	Ashgabat, Turkmenistan	
50m butterfly	22.80	Wang Peng	China	24 September 2017	2017 AIMAG	Ashgabat, Turkmenistan	
100m butterfly	50.71	Shi Feng	China	5 November 2009	2009 AIG	Hanoi, Vietnam	
100m individual medley	53.72	Sun Xiaolei	China	3 July 2013	2013 AIMAG	Incheon, South Korea	
200m individual medley	1:55.20	Qin Haiyang	China	22 September 2017	2017 AIMAG	Ashgabat, Turkmenistan	
4×50m freestyle relay	1:28.08	Lin Chien-liang (22.04); Chang Kuo-chi (22.04); An Ting-yao (21.92); Wang Yu-lian (21.72)	Chinese Taipei	24 September 2017	2017 AIMAG	Ashgabat, Turkmenistan	
4×100m freestyle relay	3:14.60	An Ting-yao (48.69); Lin Chien-liang (48.34); Chang Kuo-chi (49.37); Wang Yu-lian (48.20)	Chinese Taipei	23 September 2017	2017 AIMAG	Ashgabat, Turkmenistan	
4×50m medley relay	1:35.28	Jeong Dong-won (23.45); Moon Jae-kwon (26.42); Jeon Sung-min (23.04); Jang Dong-hyeok (22.37)	South Korea	22 September 2017	2017 AIMAG	Ashgabat, Turkmenistan	
4×100m medley relay	3:29.75	Wang Peng (52.09); Wang Lizhuo (56.77); Qin Haiyang (52.21); Chen Qiuyu (48.68)	China	25 September 2017	2017 AIMAG	Ashgabat, Turkmenistan	

Legend: WR – World record; AS – Asian record;
Records not set in finals: h – heat; sf – semifinal; r – relay 1st leg; rh – relay heat 1st leg; so – swim-off

== Women ==
Event	Time	Name	Nationality	Date	Meet	Location	Ref
50m freestyle	24.71	Jenjira Srisa-Ard	Thailand	22 September 2017	2017 AIMAG	Ashgabat, Turkmenistan	
100m freestyle	53.31	Sun Meichen	China	25 September 2017	2017 AIMAG	Ashgabat, Turkmenistan	
200m freestyle	1:55.57	Sun Meichen	China	24 September 2017	2017 AIMAG	Ashgabat, Turkmenistan	
50m backstroke	27.24	Zhou Yanxin	China	1 July 2013	2013 AIMAG	Incheon, South Korea	
100m backstroke	57.96	Zhou Yanxin	China	2 July 2013	2013 AIMAG	Incheon, South Korea	
50m breaststroke	30.88	Kim Dal-eun	South Korea	25 September 2017	2017 AIMAG	Ashgabat, Turkmenistan	
100m breaststroke	1:06.34	Back Su-yeon	South Korea	30 June 2013	2013 AIMAG	Incheon, South Korea	
50m butterfly	26.08	Guo Fan	China	6 November 2009	2009 AIG	Hanoi, Vietnam	
100m butterfly	57.41	Guo Fan	China	5 November 2009	2009 AIG	Hanoi, Vietnam	
100m individual medley	1:00.68	Nguyễn Thị Ánh Viên	Vietnam	25 September 2017	2017 AIMAG	Ashgabat, Turkmenistan	
200m individual medley	2:09.78	Nguyễn Thị Ánh Viên	Vietnam	22 September 2017	2017 AIMAG	Ashgabat, Turkmenistan	
4×50m freestyle relay	1:40.16	Lao Lihui (25.26); Feng Ling (25.16); Yu Liyan (25.35); Sun Meichen (24.39)	China	24 September 2017	2017 AIMAG	Ashgabat, Turkmenistan	
4×100m freestyle relay	3:37.94	Lao Lihui (54.25); Feng Ling (54.86); Yu Liyan (55.71); Sun Meichen (53.12)	China	23 September 2017	2017 AIMAG	Ashgabat, Turkmenistan	
4×50m medley relay	1:48.79	Stephanie Au (27.11); Yvette Kong (30.74); Chan Kin Lok (26.53); Sze Hang Yu (24.41)	Hong Kong	22 September 2017	2017 AIMAG	Ashgabat, Turkmenistan	
4×100m medley relay	3:58.31	Zhou Yanxin (58.36); Fan Rong (1:07.00); Gong Jie (58.73); Wang Fei (54.22)	China	3 July 2013	2013 AIMAG	Incheon, South Korea	

Legend: WR – World record; AS – Asian record;
Records not set in finals: h – heat; sf – semifinal; r – relay 1st leg; rh – relay heat 1st leg; so – swim-off
