= Swimming at the 2018 Asian Games – Men's 100 metre freestyle =

Men's 100 metre freestyle at the 2018 Asian Games
- Venue: Gelora Bung Karno Aquatic Stadium
- Date: 23 August 2018
- Competitors: 48 from 29 nations

Medalists
gold medal	Shinri Shioura	Japan
silver medal	Katsumi Nakamura	Japan
bronze medal	Yu Hexin	China

The men's 100 metre freestyle event at the 2018 Asian Games took place on 23 August at the Gelora Bung Karno Aquatic Stadium.

== Schedule ==
All times are Western Indonesia Time (UTC+07:00)

Date	Time	Event
Thursday, 23 August 2018	09:21	Heats
Thursday, 23 August 2018	18:21	Final

== Records ==
Prior to this competition, the existing world, Asian and Games records were as follows.

World Record	César Cielo (BRA)	46.91	Rome, Italy	30 July 2009
Asian Record	Ning Zetao (CHN)	47.65	Huangshan, China	17 October 2014
Games Record	Ning Zetao (CHN)	47.70	Incheon, South Korea	25 September 2014

== Results ==
Legend

- DNS — Did not start

=== Heats ===
Rank	Heat	Athlete	Time	Notes
1	5	Khader Baqlah (JOR)	49.30	
1	6	Yu Hexin (CHN)	49.30	
3	5	Shinri Shioura (JPN)	49.32	
4	5	Matthew Abeysinghe (SRI)	49.48	
5	6	Katsumi Nakamura (JPN)	49.50	
6	6	Hou Yujie (CHN)	49.52	
7	5	Yang Jae-hoon (KOR)	49.57	
8	4	Adil Kaskabay (KAZ)	49.72	
9	4	Kenneth To (HKG)	49.89	
10	6	Khurshidjon Tursunov (UZB)	49.90	
11	6	Darren Lim (SGP)	50.01	
12	5	Park Seon-kwan (KOR)	50.03	
13	4	Kyle Abeysinghe (SRI)	50.14	
14	6	Welson Sim (MAS)	50.34	
15	4	Hoàng Quý Phước (VIE)	50.44	
15	5	Aleksey Tarasenko (UZB)	50.44	
17	4	An Ting-yao (TPE)	50.46	
18	4	Wang Yu-lian (TPE)	50.52	
19	6	Triady Fauzi Sidiq (INA)	50.62	
20	5	Keith Lim (MAS)	50.73	
21	4	Danny Yeo (SGP)	50.93	
22	3	Sina Gholampour (IRI)	51.06	
23	6	Alexandr Varakin (KAZ)	51.07	
24	5	Jeremy Wong (HKG)	51.09	
25	3	Andrew Newling (THA)	51.36	
26	3	Benyamin Gharehhassanloo (IRI)	51.37	
27	1	Aaron D'Souza (IND)	51.50	
28	3	Mokhtar Al-Yamani (YEM)	51.51	
29	3	Mohammed Bedour (JOR)	51.62	
30	3	Raymond Sumitra Lukman (INA)	51.86	
31	3	Ngô Đình Chuyền (VIE)	52.14	
32	2	Issa Al-Adawi (OMA)	53.06	
33	2	Firas Saidi (QAT)	53.45	
34	2	Lin Sizhuang (MAC)	53.53	
35	3	Mohammad Mahfizur Rahman (BAN)	53.59	
36	2	Haseeb Tariq (PAK)	54.09	
37	2	Boldbaataryn Buyantogtokh (MGL)	55.25	
38	2	Günsennorovyn Zandanbal (MGL)	55.34	
39	2	Muhammad Yahya Khan (PAK)	56.06	
40	2	Sirish Gurung (NEP)	57.92	
41	1	Alijon Khairulloev (TJK)	58.06	
42	1	Thoeun Thol (CAM)	58.78	
43	4	Virdhawal Khade (IND)	59.11	
44	1	Olimjon Ishanov (TJK)	59.34	
45	1	Adam Barghouthy (PLE)	1:01.09	
46	1	Ali Imaan (MDV)	1:01.60	
47	1	Hussain Haish Hassan (MDV)	1:02.64	
—	1	Yousif Bu Arish (KSA)	DNS	

=== Final ===
Rank	Athlete	Time	Notes
1st place, gold medalist(s)	Shinri Shioura (JPN)	48.71	
2nd place, silver medalist(s)	Katsumi Nakamura (JPN)	48.72	
3rd place, bronze medalist(s)	Yu Hexin (CHN)	48.88	
4	Hou Yujie (CHN)	48.95	
5	Khader Baqlah (JOR)	49.10	
6	Matthew Abeysinghe (SRI)	49.28	
7	Adil Kaskabay (KAZ)	49.37	
8	Yang Jae-hoon (KOR)	49.83	
