= Swimming at the 2018 Asian Games – Men's 4 × 100 metre medley relay =

Men's 4 × 100 metre medley relay at the 2018 Asian Games
- Venue: Gelora Bung Karno Aquatic Stadium
- Date: 24 August 2018
- Competitors: 82 from 17 nations

Medalists
gold medal	China; Xu Jiayu, Yan Zibei, Li Zhuhao, Yu Hexin, Li Guangyuan, Qin Haiyang, Zheng Xiaojing, He Junyi
silver medal	Japan; Ryosuke Irie, Yasuhiro Koseki, Yuki Kobori, Shinri Shioura, Masaki Kaneko, Ippei Watanabe, Nao Horomura, Katsumi Nakamura
bronze medal	Kazakhstan; Adil Kaskabay, Dmitriy Balandin, Adilbek Mussin, Alexandr Varakin

The men's 4 × 100 metre medley relay event at the 2018 Asian Games took place on 24 August at the Gelora Bung Karno Aquatic Stadium.

== Schedule ==
All times are Western Indonesia Time (UTC+07:00)

Date	Time	Event
Friday, 24 August 2018	10:09	Heats
Friday, 24 August 2018	19:32	Final

== Records ==
Prior to this competition, the existing world, Asian and Games records were as follows.

World Record	United States	3:27.28	Rome, Italy	2 August 2009
Asian Record	Japan	3:30.19	Budapest, Hungary	30 July 2017
Games Record	China	3:31.37	Incheon, South Korea	26 September 2014

== Results ==
=== Heats ===
Rank	Heat	Team	Time	Notes
1	3	Japan (JPN)	3:36.95	
		Masaki Kaneko	54.87	
		Ippei Watanabe	1:00.03	
		Nao Horomura	52.83	
		Katsumi Nakamura	49.22	
2	2	China (CHN)	3:38.14	
		Li Guangyuan	54.64	
		Qin Haiyang	1:00.44	
		Zheng Xiaojing	54.12	
		He Junyi	48.94	
3	3	Kazakhstan (KAZ)	3:38.57	
		Adil Kaskabay	56.11	
		Dmitriy Balandin	59.39	
		Adilbek Mussin	52.46	
		Alexandr Varakin	50.61	
4	3	Singapore (SGP)	3:39.69	
		Quah Zheng Wen	55.28	
		Lionel Khoo	1:01.55	
		Joseph Schooling	53.30	
		Darren Lim	49.56	
5	3	Indonesia (INA)	3:40.00	
		I Gede Siman Sudartawa	56.07	
		Gagarin Nathaniel	1:00.87	
		Glenn Victor Sutanto	53.00	
		Triady Fauzi Sidiq	50.06	
6	2	South Korea (KOR)	3:41.85	
		Kang Ji-seok	55.34	
		Kim Jae-youn	1:02.20	
		Park Jung-hun	54.60	
		Park Seon-kwan	49.71	
7	2	Chinese Taipei (TPE)	3:43.96	
		Chuang Mu-lun	56.90	
		Lee Hsuan-yen	1:02.68	
		Chu Chen-ping	53.91	
		An Ting-yao	50.47	
8	2	Hong Kong (HKG)	3:44.16	
		Lau Shiu Yue	57.54	
		Kenneth To	1:01.47	
		Nicholas Lim	54.29	
		Jeremy Wong	50.86	
9	2	India (IND)	3:44.94	
		Srihari Nataraj	56.31	
		Sandeep Sejwal	1:04.03	
		Sajan Prakash	53.43	
		Aaron D'Souza	51.17	
10	1	Uzbekistan (UZB)	3:45.64	
		Aleksey Tarasenko	58.25	
		Vladislav Mustafin	1:03.81	
		Artyom Kozlyuk	53.98	
		Khurshidjon Tursunov	49.60	
11	3	Vietnam (VIE)	3:45.76	
		Paul Lê Nguyễn	56.02	
		Phạm Thanh Bảo	1:03.79	
		Hoàng Quý Phước	54.29	
		Ngô Đình Chuyền	51.66	
12	3	Malaysia (MAS)	3:49.08	
		Tern Jian Han	58.39	
		Foong Wei Tze	1:05.63	
		Chan Jie	54.17	
		Keith Lim	50.89	
13	2	Macau (MAC)	3:50.22	
		Ngou Pok Man	58.55	
		Chao Man Hou	1:01.67	
		Chou Kit	57.80	
		Lin Sizhuang	52.20	
14	3	Mongolia (MGL)	4:09.99	
		Erdenemönkhiin Demüül	1:03.99	
		Günsennorovyn Zandanbal	1:09.11	
		Batmönkhiin Jürmed	1:01.49	
		Boldbaataryn Buyantogtokh	55.40	
15	2	Pakistan (PAK)	4:10.92	
		Haseeb Tariq	59.05	
		Muhammad Hamza Malik	1:13.96	
		Kawas Behram Aga	1:02.25	
		Muhammad Yahya Khan	55.66	
16	1	Qatar (QAT)	4:15.23	
		Abdulaziz Al-Obaidly	1:01.78	
		Abdelrahman Hesham Mohamed	1:12.13	
		Firas Saidi	1:01.29	
		Youssef Hesham Mohamed	1:00.03	
17	1	Maldives (MDV)	4:47.94	
		Ali Imaan	1:12.43	
		Hassan Ashraf	1:20.83	
		Mubal Azzam Ibrahim	1:11.82	
		Hussain Haish Hassan	1:02.86	

=== Final ===
Rank	Team	Time	Notes
1st place, gold medalist(s)	China (CHN)	3:29.99	AR
	Xu Jiayu	52.60	
	Yan Zibei	58.86	
	Li Zhuhao	50.61	
	Yu Hexin	47.92	
2nd place, silver medalist(s)	Japan (JPN)	3:30.03	
	Ryosuke Irie	52.53	
	Yasuhiro Koseki	58.45	
	Yuki Kobori	51.06	
	Shinri Shioura	47.99	
3rd place, bronze medalist(s)	Kazakhstan (KAZ)	3:35.62	
	Adil Kaskabay	55.53	
	Dmitriy Balandin	58.88	
	Adilbek Mussin	52.44	
	Alexandr Varakin	48.77	
4	Singapore (SGP)	3:37.68	
	Quah Zheng Wen	54.69	
	Lionel Khoo	1:02.17	
	Joseph Schooling	51.53	
	Darren Chua	49.29	
5	South Korea (KOR)	3:37.93	
	Lee Ju-ho	54.77	
	Moon Jae-kwon	1:00.87	
	Chang Gyu-cheol	53.15	
	Yang Jae-hoon	49.14	
6	Indonesia (INA)	3:38.18	
	I Gede Siman Sudartawa	55.02	
	Gagarin Nathaniel	1:01.40	
	Glenn Victor Sutanto	52.48	
	Triady Fauzi Sidiq	49.28	
7	Chinese Taipei (TPE)	3:41.52	
	Chuang Mu-lun	56.55	
	Lee Hsuan-yen	1:01.48	
	Chu Chen-ping	54.07	
	An Ting-yao	49.42	
8	Hong Kong (HKG)	3:44.61	
	Lau Shiu Yue	58.08	
	Boris Yang	1:03.30	
	Nicholas Lim	54.44	
	Kenneth To	48.79	
