= Ilya Musin =

Ilya Musin may refer to:

- Ilya Musin (conductor) (1903–1999), Russian conductor
- Ilya Musin (ice hockey) (born 1991), Russian ice hockey player
