= Musin =

Musin, Mussin (masculine; Мусин) or Musina (feminine; Мусина) is a popular Russian and Tatar surname which may refer to:

- Adilbek Mussin (born 1999), Kazakh swimmer
- Agrafena Musina-Pushkina (1740–1782/86), Russian stage actress and opera singer
- Aleksei Musin-Pushkin (1744–1817), Russian statesman, historian and art collector
- Apollo Mussin-Pushkin (1760–1805), Russian chemist and plant collector
- Aslan Musin (born 1955), Kazakh politician
- Damir Musin (born 1994), Russian ice hockey player
- Bağdat Musin (born 1983), Kazakh politician
- François Musin (1820–1888), Belgian painter
- Ilya Musin (1903–1999), Russian conductor
- Ilya Musin (born 1991), Russian ice hockey player
- Leonid Musin (born 1985), Ukrainian footballer
- Oleg Musin (born 1975), Kazakh footballer
- Ovide Musin (1854–1929), Belgian violinist and composer
- Raisa Musina (born 1998), Russian basketball player
- Valentin Musin-Pushkin (1735–1804), Russian military and government official
