= Musina (disambiguation) =

Musina is a town in South Africa.

Musina may also refer to:

== Places ==
- Musina Local Municipality, South Africa
- Musina, Bulgaria, a village
- Musina Glacier, Antarctica

== People ==
- Alexandru Muşina Romanian poet, essayist, and editor
- Luigi Musina, Italian boxer
- Musina, the feminine form of the Russian surname Musin

== See also ==
- Mussina
