= Palestine at the 2017 Asian Indoor and Martial Arts Games =

- IOC code: PLE
- NOC: Palestine Olympic Committee
- Website: www.poc.ps

in Ashgabat 17–27 September
- Competitors: 19 in 6 sports
- Medals Ranked 0th: Gold 0 Silver 0 Bronze 0 Total 0

Asian Indoor and Martial Arts Games appearances
- 2007; 2009; 2013; 2017–2021; 2025

Palestine competed at the 2017 Asian Indoor and Martial Arts Games held in Ashgabat, Turkmenistan from September 17 to 27. Palestine sent a delegation of 19 competitors for the event competing in 6 different sports.

The Palestinian team didn't receive any medal at the Games.

== Participants ==
Sport	Men	Women	Total
Futsal	8	0	8
Weightlifting	3	0	3
Short course swimming	2	1	3
Indoor Athletics	2	0	2
Taekwondo	1	1	2
Wrestling	1	0	1
