= Guam at the 2017 Asian Indoor and Martial Arts Games =

- IOC code: GUM
- NOC: Guam National Olympic Committee
- Website: www.oceaniasport.com/guam/

in Ashgabat 17–27 September
- Competitors: 34 in 7 sports
- Medals: Gold 0 Silver 0 Bronze 0 Total 0

Asian Indoor and Martial Arts Games appearances
- 2017; 2021; 2025

Guam competed at the 2017 Asian Indoor and Martial Arts Games held in Ashgabat, Turkmenistan from September 17 to 27. Guam sent a delegation consisting of 34 participants in the competition. Guam didn't receive any medal at the Games.

Guam made its first appearance at an Asian Indoor and Martial Arts Games for the first time along with other Oceania nations.

== Participants ==
Sport	Men	Women	Total
3x3 basketball	4	4	8
Wrestling	5	3	8
Bowling	4	0	4
Taekwondo	3	1	4
Weightlifting	2	2	4
Short course swimming	2	2	4
Taekwondo	2	0	2
