= Marshall Islands at the 2017 Asian Indoor and Martial Arts Games =

- IOC code: MHL
- NOC: Marshall Islands National Olympic Committee
- Website: www.oceaniasport.com/marshalls

in Ashgabat 17–27 September
- Competitors: 10 in 4 sports
- Medals: Gold 0 Silver 1 Bronze 0 Total 1

Asian Indoor and Martial Arts Games appearances
- 2017; 2021; 2026

Marshall Islands competed at the 2017 Asian Indoor and Martial Arts Games held in Ashgabat, Turkmenistan from September 17 to 27. Marshall Islands sent a delegation consisting of 10 athletes competing in 4 different sports. Mattie Sasser was the only medalist in the event for the Marshall Islands as she claimed the silver medal in the women's under 63 kg category.

Marshall Islands made its debut in an Asian Indoor and Martial Arts Games for the first time at the Games held in Turkmenistan along with other Oceania nations.

== Participants ==
Sport	Men	Women	Total
Short course swimming	1	2	3
Indoor Athletics	2	0	2
Wrestling	2	1	3
Weightlifting	1	1	2

== Medallists ==
Medal	Name	Sport	Event
Silver	Mattie Sasser	Weightlifting	Women's 63 kg
