= Nauru at the 2017 Asian Indoor and Martial Arts Games =

- IOC code: NRU
- NOC: Nauru Olympic Committee
- Website: www.oceaniasport.com/nauru

in Ashgabat 17–27 September
- Competitors: 9 in 3 sports
- Medals: Gold 0 Silver 0 Bronze 0 Total 0

Asian Indoor and Martial Arts Games appearances
- 2017; 2021; 2026

Nauru competed at the 2017 Asian Indoor and Martial Arts Games held in Ashgabat, Turkmenistan from September 17 to 27. 9 participants competed in 3 different sports. Nauru did not win any medals in the multi-sport event.

Nauru made its debut in an Asian Indoor and Martial Arts Games at the competition held in Turkmenistan along with other Oceania nations.

== Participants ==
Sport	Men	Women	Total
Indoor Athletics	1	0	1
Weightlifting	3	3	6
Wrestling	2	0	2

== Indoor Athletics ==
Nauru participated in indoor athletics.

Key

- Note–Ranks given for track events are within the athlete's heat only
- Q = Qualified for the next round
- q = Qualified for the next round as a fastest loser or, in field events, by position without achieving the qualifying target
- qR = Qualified to the next round by referee judgement
- NR = National record
- N/A = Round not applicable for the event
- Bye = Athlete not required to compete in round

Track & road events
Men

Athlete	Event	Heat		Semifinal		Final	
Athlete	Event	Time	Rank	Time	Rank	Time	Rank
Joshua Jeremiah	60 m	7.36	5	Did not advance			

== Weightlifting ==
Nauru participated in weightlifting.

Men

Athlete	Event	Snatch		Clean & Jerk		Total	
Athlete	Event	Result	Rank	Result	Rank	Result	Rank
Elson Brechtefeld	−56 kg	102	10	129	9	325	10
Ezekiel Moses	−62 kg	97	11	125	10	222	10
Larko Doguape	−69 kg	101	12	130	12	231	12

Women

Athlete	Event	Snatch		Clean & Jerk		Total	
Athlete	Event	Result	Rank	Result	Rank	Result	Rank
Liebon Akua	−53 kg	52	12	60	11	112	11
Maximina Uepa	−63 kg	72	9	90	9	162	9
Ricci Daniel	−69 kg	63	10	84	10	147	10

== Wrestling ==
Nauru participated in wrestling.

Key:

- VT (ranking points: 5–0 or 0–5) – Victory by fall.
- VB (ranking points: 5–0 or 0–5) – Victory by injury (VF for forfeit, VA for withdrawal or disqualification)
- PP (ranking points: 3–1 or 1–3) – Decision by points – the loser with technical points.
- PO (ranking points: 3–0 or 0–3) – Decision by points – the loser without technical points.
- ST (ranking points: 4–0 or 0–4) – Great superiority – the loser without technical points and a margin of victory of at least 8 (Greco-Roman) or 10 (freestyle) points.
- SP (ranking points: 4–1 or 1–4) – Technical superiority – the loser with technical points and a margin of victory of at least 8 (Greco-Roman) or 10 (freestyle) points.

Men

Athlete	Event	1/8 Finals	Quarterfinal	Semifinals	Repechage	Final / BM	
Athlete	Event	Opposition Result	Opposition Result	Opposition Result	Opposition Result	Opposition Result	Rank
Lowe Bingham	-61 kg	Ramazonov (TJK); L 0–10	Did not advance				
Maverick Kun	-65 kg	Hakiki (INA); L 10–0	Did not advance				
