= Bangladesh at the 2017 Asian Indoor and Martial Arts Games =

- IOC code: BAN
- NOC: Bangladesh Olympic Association
- Website: www.nocban.org

in Ashgabat 17–27 September
- Competitors: 11 in 6 sports
- Medals: Gold 0 Silver 0 Bronze 0 Total 0

Asian Indoor and Martial Arts Games appearances
- 2007; 2009; 2013; 2017; 2021; 2025

Bangladesh competed at the 2017 Asian Indoor and Martial Arts Games held in Ashgabat, Turkmenistan from 17 to 27 September. Bangladesh sent 11 competitors for the multi-sport event and the nation finished the competition without receiving any medals.

== Participants ==
Sport	Men	Women	Total
Belt wrestling	2	0	2
Chess	2	2	4
Short course swimming	1	0	1
Taekwondo	0	1	1
Weightlifting	1	1	2
Wrestling	0	1	1
