= Samoa at the 2017 Asian Indoor and Martial Arts Games =

- IOC code: SAM
- NOC: Samoa Association of Sports and National Olympic Committee Inc.
- Website: www.oceaniasport.com/samoa

in Ashgabat 17–27 September
- Competitors: 15 in 4 sports
- Medals: Gold 0 Silver 0 Bronze 1 Total 1

Asian Indoor and Martial Arts Games appearances
- 2017; 2021; 2025

Samoa competed at the 2017 Asian Indoor and Martial Arts Games held in Ashgabat, Turkmenistan from September 17 to 27. Samoa sent a delegation consisting of 15 athletes competing in 3 different sports. Iuniarra Sipaia was the only medalist in the event for Samoa as she claimed the bronze medal in the women's weightlifting over 90 kg category.

Samoa made its debut in an Asian Indoor and Martial Arts Games for the first time at the Games held in Turkmenistan along with other Oceania nations.

== Participants ==
Sport	Men	Women	Total
3x3 basketball	4	0	4
Indoor Athletics	1	0	1
Indoor tennis	0	1	1
Weightlifting	6	3	9

== Medallists ==
Medal	Name	Sport	Event
Bronze	Iuniarra Sipaia	Weightlifting	Women's 90+ kg
