= Cook Islands at the 2017 Asian Indoor and Martial Arts Games =

- IOC code: COK
- NOC: Cook Islands Sports and Olympic Committee
- Website: www.oceaniasport.com/cookis

in Ashgabat 17–27 September
- Competitors: 10 in 4 sports
- Medals: Gold 0 Silver 0 Bronze 0 Total 0

Asian Indoor and Martial Arts Games appearances
- 2017; 2021; 2025

Cook Islands competed at the 2017 Asian Indoor and Martial Arts Games held in Ashgabat, Turkmenistan from September 17 to 27. 10 athletes competed in 4 different sports. Cook Islands team couldn't receive any medal at the Games.

Cook Islands also made its first appearance at an Asian Indoor and Martial Arts Games event during the Games along with other Oceania nations.

== Participants ==
Sport	Men	Women	Total
3×3 basketball	0	4	4
Indoor Athletics	0	1	1
Short course swimming	2	1	3
Weightlifting	0	2	2

== 3×3 basketball ==
Cook Islands participated in 3×3 basketball.

Summary

Team	Event	Group stage		Quarterfinal	Semifinal	Final / BM	
Team	Event	Opposition Score	Opposition Score	Opposition Score	Rank	Opposition Score	Rank
Cook Islands women's 3×3 basketball team	Women's tournament	Jordan; L 17-6	Uzbekistan; L 21-10	Did not advance			8

=== Women's tournament ===
Team roster

- Janet Main
- Terai Sadler
- Adoniah Lewis
- Keziah Lewis

== Indoor Athletics ==
Cook Islands participated in indoor athletics.

Key

- Note–Ranks given for track events are within the athlete's heat only
- Q = Qualified for the next round
- q = Qualified for the next round as a fastest loser or, in field events, by position without achieving the qualifying target
- qR = Qualified to the next round by referee judgement
- NR = National record
- N/A = Round not applicable for the event
- Bye = Athlete not required to compete in round

Field events
Women

Athlete	Event	Heat		Semifinal		Final	
Athlete	Event	Time	Rank	Time	Rank	Time	Rank
Tereapii Tapoki	Shot put	—				13.39	5

== Short course swimming ==
Cook Islands participated in short course swimming.

Men

Athlete	Event	Heat		Final	
Athlete	Event	Time	Rank	Time	Rank
Temaruata Strickland	50 m freestyle	24.74	28	Did not advance	
Temaruata Strickland	100 m freestyle	54.85	26	Did not advance	
Temaruata Strickland	50 m butterfly	27.42	29	Did not advance	
Bede Aitu	100 m freestyle	56.80	31	Did not advance	
Bede Aitu	50 m backstroke	28.74	22	Did not advance	
Bede Aitu	100 m backstroke	1:01.81	17	Did not advance	
Bede Aitu	50 m breaststroke	31.51	23	Did not advance	
Bede Aitu	100 m breaststroke	1:08.69	25	Did not advance	
Bede Aitu	100 m individual medley	1:02.94	24	Did not advance	

Women

Athlete	Event	Heat		Final	
Athlete	Event	Time	Rank	Time	Rank
Kirsten Fisher-Marsters	50 m freestyle	27.93	14	Did not advance	
Kirsten Fisher-Marsters	50 m breaststroke	33.70	8 Q	33.98	8
Kirsten Fisher-Marsters	100 m breaststroke	1:14.75	10	Did not advance	

== Weightlifting ==
Cook Islands participated in weightlifting.

Women

Athlete	Event	Snatch		Clean & Jerk		Total	
Athlete	Event	Result	Rank	Result	Rank	Result	Rank
Philippa Woonton	−75 kg	72	6	90	6	162	6
Luisa Peters	+90 kg	100	5	120	6	220	6
