= Janet Main =

New Zealand basketball player (1989-)

No. 6 – Otago Goldrush (2009 –)
- Position: Guard

Personal information
- Born: 22 June 1989 (age 37)
- Listed height: 191 cm (6 ft 3 in)
- Listed weight: 89 kg (196 lb)

Janet Main (born 22 June 1989) is a New Zealand female basketball player. She generally plays for New Zealand in international competitions and has also represented Cook Islands at the 3x3 basketball events. She currently plays for the Otago Goldrush, a New Zealand domestic basketball team.

== Basketball career ==
Janet competed at the 2016 FIBA 3x3 World Championships in the women's 3x3 event as a shooter representing Cook Islands. This was also the first instance that Cook Islands was eligible to participate in the FIBA 3x3 Basketball Championships. Janet Main took part in the shootout contest managing two points in ten attempts from the top of the arc. Apart from that, she too represented the Cook Islands at the 2017 Asian Indoor and Martial Arts Games finishing at 9th place.

== Personal life ==
She is also working as a physiotherapist for some basketball teams.
