= Park Ye-rin =

South Korean swimmer (born 2000)

Personal information
- Born: 29 April 2000 (age 26)

Sport
- Sport: Swimming
Medal record
Women's swimming
Representing South Korea
Asian Games
Bronze medal – third place	2018 Jakarta	4×100 m mixed medley

Park Ye-rin (born 29 April 2000) is a South Korean swimmer. In 2018, she won the bronze medal in the mixed 4 × 100 metre medley relay event at the 2018 Asian Games held in Jakarta, Indonesia.

In 2017, she won the silver medal in the women's short course 50 metre butterfly event and the bronze medal in the women's short course 100 metre butterfly event at the 2017 Asian Indoor and Martial Arts Games held in Ashgabat, Turkmenistan.

In 2019, she represented South Korea at the 2019 World Aquatics Championships held in Gwangju, South Korea. She competed in the women's 50 metre butterfly and women's 100 metre butterfly events. She also competed in the women's 4 × 100 metre medley relay and 4 × 100 metre mixed medley relay events.
