= Weightlifting at the 2017 Asian Indoor and Martial Arts Games =

- Venue: Ashgabat Weightlifting Arena
- Dates: 18–25 September 2017

Weightlifting competitions at the 2017 Asian Indoor and Martial Arts Games in Ashgabat, Turkmenistan, took place from 18 to 25 September at the Weightlifting Arena. Around 188 athletes competed in 16 different events, according to their respective weight categories.

== Medalists ==
=== Men ===
Event	Gold	Silver	Bronze
56 kg	Thạch Kim Tuấn; Vietnam	Trần Lê Quốc Toàn; Vietnam	Jia Xionghui; China
62 kg	Trịnh Văn Vinh; Vietnam	Lei Haitao; China	Meretguly Sähetmyradow; Turkmenistan
69 kg	Deng Shiwei; China	Doston Yokubov; Uzbekistan	Mahmoud Al-Humayd; Saudi Arabia
77 kg	Rejepbaý Rejepow; Turkmenistan	Shakhzod Khudayberganov; Uzbekistan	Ahmed Farooq; Iraq
85 kg	Safaa Rashed; Iraq	Ulugbek Alimov; Uzbekistan	Ali Miri; Iran
94 kg	Sohrab Moradi; Iran	Farkhodbek Sobirov; Uzbekistan	Liu Hao; China
105 kg	Ivan Efremov; Uzbekistan	Ali Hashemi; Iran	Salwan Jasim; Iraq
+105 kg	Rustam Djangabaev; Uzbekistan	Hojamuhammet Toýçyýew; Turkmenistan	Homayoun Teymouri; Iran

=== Women ===
Event	Gold	Silver	Bronze
48 kg	Xiao Huiying; China	Ýulduz Jumabaýewa; Turkmenistan	Vương Thị Huyền; Vietnam
53 kg	Liao Qiuyun; China	Hidilyn Diaz; Philippines	Kristina Şermetowa; Turkmenistan
58 kg	Luo Xiaomin; China	Muattar Nabieva; Uzbekistan	Acchedya Jagaddhita; Indonesia
63 kg	Yuan Wangjian; China	Mattie Sasser; Marshall Islands	An Si-sung; South Korea
69 kg	Assem Sadykova; Kazakhstan	Apolonia Vaivai; Fiji	Kristel Macrohon; Philippines
75 kg	Mönkhjantsangiin Ankhtsetseg; Mongolia	Omadoy Otakuziyeva; Uzbekistan	Ayumi Kamiya; Japan
90 kg	Eileen Cikamatana; Fiji	Aýsoltan Toýçyýewa; Turkmenistan	Dolera Davronova; Uzbekistan
+90 kg	Jia Weipeng; China	Alexandra Aborneva; Kazakhstan	Iuniarra Sipaia; Samoa

== Medal table ==
Rank	Nation	Gold	Silver	Bronze	Total
1	China (CHN)	6	1	2	9
2	Uzbekistan (UZB)	2	6	1	9
3	Vietnam (VIE)	2	1	1	4
4	Turkmenistan (TKM)	1	3	2	6
5	Iran (IRI)	1	1	2	4
6	Fiji (FIJ)	1	1	0	2
6	Kazakhstan (KAZ)	1	1	0	2
8	Iraq (IRQ)	1	0	2	3
9	Mongolia (MGL)	1	0	0	1
10	Philippines (PHI)	0	1	1	2
11	Marshall Islands (MHL)	0	1	0	1
12	Indonesia (INA)	0	0	1	1
12	Japan (JPN)	0	0	1	1
12	Samoa (SAM)	0	0	1	1
12	Saudi Arabia (KSA)	0	0	1	1
12	South Korea (KOR)	0	0	1	1
Totals (16 entries)		16	16	16	48

== Results ==
=== Men ===
==== 56 kg ====
18 September

Rank	Athlete	Group	Snatch (kg)				Clean & Jerk (kg)				Total
Rank	Athlete	Group	1	2	3	Result	1	2	3	Result	Total
1st place, gold medalist(s)	Thạch Kim Tuấn (VIE)	A	125	129	131	131	147	151	~~153~~	151	282
2nd place, silver medalist(s)	Trần Lê Quốc Toàn (VIE)	A	120	124	~~127~~	124	147	152	~~159~~	152	276
3rd place, bronze medalist(s)	Jia Xionghui (CHN)	A	118	123	128	128	133	138	141	141	269
4	Igor Son (KAZ)	A	110	115	120	120	137	~~150~~	~~150~~	137	257
5	Seraj Al-Saleem (KSA)	A	105	110	~~113~~	110	134	140	~~142~~	140	250
6	Patiphan Bupphamala (THA)	A	105	110	~~113~~	110	127	132	~~136~~	132	242
7	Kamal Egodawatte (SRI)	A	108	110	112	112	~~128~~	128	~~132~~	128	240
8	Omarguly Handurdyýew (TKM)	A	110	~~114~~	~~115~~	110	130	—	—	130	240
9	Manueli Tulo (FIJ)	A	105	~~109~~	~~109~~	105	~~135~~	135	~~140~~	135	240
10	Elson Brechtefeld (NRU)	A	92	97	102	102	125	129	~~132~~	129	231
11	Chen Chia-lung (TPE)	A	92	95	~~97~~	95	112	115	~~118~~	115	210

==== 62 kg ====
19 September

Rank	Athlete	Group	Snatch (kg)				Clean & Jerk (kg)				Total
Rank	Athlete	Group	1	2	3	Result	1	2	3	Result	Total
1st place, gold medalist(s)	Trịnh Văn Vinh (VIE)	A	128	133	136	136	162	166	~~173~~	166	302
2nd place, silver medalist(s)	Lei Haitao (CHN)	A	126	131	~~135~~	131	157	~~163~~	~~172~~	157	288
3rd place, bronze medalist(s)	Meretguly Sähetmyradow (TKM)	A	125	129	132	132	155	~~159~~	~~161~~	155	287
4	Jon Ho-gyong (PRK)	A	~~120~~	120	124	124	156	162	~~164~~	162	286
5	Morea Baru (PNG)	A	116	121	~~125~~	121	156	160	~~167~~	160	281
6	Muhammad Purkon (INA)	A	~~120~~	121	~~126~~	121	145	~~150~~	~~151~~	145	266
7	Abbas Al-Abdulal (KSA)	A	115	119	~~121~~	119	140	~~145~~	145	145	264
8	Chiang Nien-en (TPE)	A	~~113~~	~~113~~	113	113	145	~~151~~	151	151	264
9	Sangeeth Wijesuriya (SRI)	B	105	109	~~111~~	109	135	141	~~143~~	141	250
10	Ezekiel Moses (NRU)	B	90	95	97	97	120	125	~~128~~	125	222
11	Julius Naranjo (GUM)	B	~~92~~	92	95	95	~~120~~	~~120~~	120	120	215
12	Manuila Raobu (TUV)	B	90	~~95~~	~~95~~	90	110	115	~~118~~	115	205
13	Takirua Betero (KIR)	B	~~87~~	87	~~92~~	87	~~115~~	115	~~120~~	115	202
14	Shafiq Jan Sakhizada (AFG)	B	70	78	~~82~~	78	90	~~98~~	~~98~~	90	168
—	Faisal Al-Sulami (KSA)	A	113	117	~~121~~	117	~~132~~	~~132~~	—	—	NM

==== 69 kg ====
20 September

Rank	Athlete	Group	Snatch (kg)				Clean & Jerk (kg)				Total
Rank	Athlete	Group	1	2	3	Result	1	2	3	Result	Total
1st place, gold medalist(s)	Deng Shiwei (CHN)	A	140	145	148	148	171	176	179	179	327
2nd place, silver medalist(s)	Doston Yokubov (UZB)	A	135	139	~~141~~	139	173	177	~~189~~	177	316
3rd place, bronze medalist(s)	Mahmoud Al-Humayd (KSA)	A	~~133~~	133	~~137~~	133	171	174	~~176~~	174	307
4	Tolkunbek Hudaýbergenow (TKM)	A	128	132	~~135~~	132	~~173~~	173	~~176~~	173	305
5	Mohsen Al-Duhaylib (KSA)	A	130	137	~~139~~	137	~~161~~	162	~~170~~	162	299
6	Vaipava Ioane (SAM)	A	120	~~125~~	125	125	~~170~~	170	~~176~~	170	295
7	Muhammad Hasbi (INA)	A	130	~~136~~	~~136~~	130	162	~~170~~	~~170~~	162	292
8	Brandon Wakeling (AUS)	A	114	~~119~~	~~119~~	114	147	154	~~160~~	154	268
9	Ruben Katoatau (KIR)	A	110	115	~~120~~	115	140	150	~~157~~	150	265
10	Shimul Kanti Singha (BAN)	B	110	~~117~~	117	117	135	~~142~~	142	142	259
11	Abdukhakim Khakberdiev (TJK)	B	~~100~~	100	107	107	130	136	~~143~~	136	243
12	Larko Doguape (NRU)	B	95	101	~~106~~	101	125	130	~~134~~	130	231
13	Prakash K. C. (NEP)	B	95	100	~~105~~	100	125	~~130~~	~~130~~	125	225
—	Leslie Mae (SOL)	B	~~90~~	90	93	93	~~110~~	~~110~~	~~110~~	—	NM

==== 77 kg ====
21 September

Rank	Athlete	Group	Snatch (kg)				Clean & Jerk (kg)				Total
Rank	Athlete	Group	1	2	3	Result	1	2	3	Result	Total
1st place, gold medalist(s)	Rejepbaý Rejepow (TKM)	A	155	159	162	162	185	188	191	191	353
2nd place, silver medalist(s)	Shakhzod Khudayberganov (UZB)	A	150	155	~~159~~	155	180	187	~~192~~	187	342
3rd place, bronze medalist(s)	Ahmed Farooq (IRQ)	A	140	144	146	146	~~177~~	~~177~~	177	177	323
4	I Ketut Ariana (INA)	A	141	145	~~148~~	145	172	~~179~~	~~179~~	172	317
5	Hsieh Shu-yin (TPE)	A	133	140	~~144~~	140	~~173~~	173	~~180~~	173	313
6	Manop Chitrakan (THA)	A	125	130	135	135	171	~~177~~	~~179~~	171	306
7	Şöhrat Hojamyradow (TKM)	A	140	144	~~149~~	144	160	~~170~~	~~170~~	160	304
8	Taretiita Tabaroua (KIR)	A	120	125	~~130~~	125	165	170	~~175~~	170	295
9	Toua Udia (PNG)	A	120	125	~~130~~	125	165	170	~~175~~	170	295
10	Furqan Anwar (PAK)	B	123	127	~~130~~	127	150	~~155~~	~~155~~	150	277
11	Patrick Veidreyaki (FIJ)	B	110	115	~~118~~	115	140	~~152~~	—	140	255
12	Ramoiljon Zabirov (TJK)	B	115	~~120~~	~~120~~	115	135	140	~~147~~	140	255
13	Ilkhomjon Shukurov (TJK)	B	105	110	~~113~~	110	125	132	137	137	247
—	Mikhail Makeyev (KAZ)	A	~~140~~	—	—	—	—	—	—	—	NM

==== 85 kg ====
22 September

Rank	Athlete	Group	Snatch (kg)				Clean & Jerk (kg)				Total
Rank	Athlete	Group	1	2	3	Result	1	2	3	Result	Total
1st place, gold medalist(s)	Safaa Rashed (IRQ)	A	155	159	161	161	199	204	~~207~~	204	365
2nd place, silver medalist(s)	Ulugbek Alimov (UZB)	A	~~160~~	160	164	164	195	200	~~204~~	200	364
3rd place, bronze medalist(s)	Ali Miri (IRI)	A	~~155~~	155	160	160	195	201	~~205~~	201	361
4	Daýanç Aşyrow (TKM)	A	~~160~~	160	165	165	187	191	~~195~~	191	356
5	Pornchai Lobsi (THA)	A	145	151	~~155~~	151	185	191	~~195~~	191	342
6	Chen Hu (CHN)	A	145	~~150~~	150	150	182	187	~~193~~	187	337
7	Semen Linder (KAZ)	A	150	155	~~160~~	155	175	~~180~~	180	180	335
8	Khalil Al-Hamqan (KSA)	A	142	147	150	150	176	181	~~185~~	181	331
9	Don Opeloge (SAM)	A	137	142	~~150~~	142	177	~~182~~	~~182~~	177	319
10	Kim Yeong-seop (KOR)	B	130	135	140	140	170	175	~~181~~	175	315
11	An Ung (KOR)	B	137	145	~~151~~	145	160	~~167~~	~~170~~	160	305
12	Malek Faed (JOR)	B	125	131	~~136~~	131	160	~~165~~	~~165~~	160	291
13	Kabuati Bob (MHL)	B	~~118~~	118	123	123	160	165	~~170~~	165	288
14	Asomuddin Sangov (TJK)	B	117	122	~~127~~	122	145	150	155	155	277
15	David Gorosi (SOL)	B	~~118~~	118	121	121	~~152~~	152	155	155	276
16	Khaled Al-Aboudi (JOR)	B	110	~~115~~	115	115	137	142	145	145	260
17	Timothy Vakuruivalu (FIJ)	B	100	104	~~108~~	104	125	~~130~~	~~130~~	125	229
18	Vili Eliko (TUV)	B	75	80	~~85~~	80	105	~~110~~	~~110~~	105	185

==== 94 kg ====
23 September

Rank	Athlete	Group	Snatch (kg)				Clean & Jerk (kg)				Total
Rank	Athlete	Group	1	2	3	Result	1	2	3	Result	Total
1st place, gold medalist(s)	Sohrab Moradi (IRI)	A	176	181	185	185	~~220~~	220	228	228	413
2nd place, silver medalist(s)	Farkhodbek Sobirov (UZB)	A	175	~~180~~	181	181	205	210	~~215~~	210	391
3rd place, bronze medalist(s)	Liu Hao (CHN)	A	~~168~~	172	176	176	205	211	~~216~~	211	387
4	Fares El-Bakh (QAT)	A	161	166	168	168	205	211	~~215~~	211	379
5	Kim In-su (KOR)	A	155	~~160~~	160	160	185	190	197	197	357
6	Ivan Golushko (KAZ)	A	150	160	~~162~~	160	180	185	190	190	350
7	Steven Kari (PNG)	A	143	148	153	153	185	195	~~205~~	195	348
8	Siaosi Leuo (SAM)	A	150	~~154~~	154	154	~~187~~	187	~~200~~	187	341
9	Usman Amjad Rathore (PAK)	A	143	147	152	152	~~175~~	175	181	181	333
10	Ruslan Ramazanow (TKM)	A	145	~~153~~	154	154	~~175~~	175	~~184~~	175	329
11	Petunu Opeloge (SAM)	B	135	140	~~145~~	140	175	183	~~190~~	183	323
12	Wang Wei-cheng (TPE)	B	130	140	~~145~~	140	165	~~172~~	~~175~~	165	305
13	Jacob Marquardt (AUS)	B	125	130	135	135	155	160	~~172~~	160	295
14	Nurullo Usmondzhoni (TJK)	B	115	~~120~~	~~120~~	115	140	145	150	150	265
15	Mirwais Raziqi (AFG)	B	100	107	~~115~~	107	135	142	~~150~~	142	249
16	Brandon Holm (GUM)	B	105	~~108~~	108	108	125	130	133	133	241

==== 105 kg ====
24 September

Rank	Athlete	Group	Snatch (kg)				Clean & Jerk (kg)				Total
Rank	Athlete	Group	1	2	3	Result	1	2	3	Result	Total
1st place, gold medalist(s)	Ivan Efremov (UZB)	A	185	190	~~195~~	190	210	217	221	221	411
2nd place, silver medalist(s)	Ali Hashemi (IRI)	A	175	181	~~186~~	181	212	220	~~231~~	220	401
3rd place, bronze medalist(s)	Salwan Jasim (IRQ)	A	176	~~180~~	~~180~~	176	216	219	~~226~~	219	395
4	Alireza Soleimani (IRI)	A	175	181	~~186~~	181	210	~~218~~	~~218~~	210	391
5	Ibragim Bersanov (KAZ)	A	165	170	~~176~~	170	190	~~195~~	200	200	370
6	Sanele Mao (SAM)	A	~~145~~	145	152	152	185	191	200	200	352
7	Tinnaphop Kanrawangchai (THA)	A	145	150	~~155~~	150	185	~~190~~	~~190~~	185	335
8	Ridge Barredo (AUS)	B	138	142	146	146	175	181	~~186~~	181	327
9	David Katoatau (KIR)	B	130	135	~~140~~	135	175	185	~~193~~	185	320
10	Jamil Akhter (PAK)	A	140	144	~~147~~	144	~~170~~	170	175	175	319
11	Matthew Lydement (AUS)	B	~~135~~	135	~~140~~	135	160	165	~~170~~	165	300
12	Lin Sheng-lun (TPE)	B	120	~~135~~	~~135~~	120	150	165	175	175	295
13	Raad Al-Khawaldeh (JOR)	B	125	130	~~135~~	130	155	~~160~~	~~160~~	155	285

==== +105 kg ====
25 September

Rank	Athlete	Group	Snatch (kg)				Clean & Jerk (kg)				Total
Rank	Athlete	Group	1	2	3	Result	1	2	3	Result	Total
1st place, gold medalist(s)	Rustam Djangabaev (UZB)	A	190	195	199	199	230	236	243	243	442
2nd place, silver medalist(s)	Hojamuhammet Toýçyýew (TKM)	A	185	192	~~199~~	192	230	235	239	239	431
3rd place, bronze medalist(s)	Homayoun Teymouri (IRI)	A	~~188~~	190	195	195	~~225~~	226	235	235	430
4	Selimkhan Abubakarov (KAZ)	A	180	185	~~190~~	185	220	225	230	230	415
5	Lauititi Lui (SAM)	A	165	173	180	180	210	~~220~~	~~220~~	210	390
6	Ding Fengshan (CHN)	A	165	171	175	175	195	202	205	205	380
7	Hsieh Yun-ting (TPE)	A	140	~~150~~	150	150	180	~~188~~	~~190~~	180	330
8	Ushan Charuka (SRI)	A	130	~~136~~	139	139	168	176	180	180	319
9	Fazal Turkman (AFG)	A	115	125	~~130~~	125	150	155	160	160	285
10	Sateki Langi (TGA)	A	110	~~116~~	~~119~~	110	140	~~153~~	~~153~~	140	250

=== Women ===
==== 48 kg ====
18 September

Rank	Athlete	Group	Snatch (kg)				Clean & Jerk (kg)				Total
Rank	Athlete	Group	1	2	3	Result	1	2	3	Result	Total
1st place, gold medalist(s)	Xiao Huiying (CHN)	A	80	~~84~~	~~84~~	80	105	107	110	110	190
2nd place, silver medalist(s)	Ýulduz Jumabaýewa (TKM)	A	78	80	82	82	100	105	107	107	189
3rd place, bronze medalist(s)	Vương Thị Huyền (VIE)	A	79	83	85	85	98	101	~~105~~	101	186
4	Amnuaiporn Maneewan (THA)	A	75	80	~~81~~	80	98	101	~~107~~	101	181
5	Chiraphan Nanthawong (THA)	A	73	~~76~~	76	76	95	~~100~~	~~100~~	95	171
6	Mahliyo Togoeva (UZB)	A	70	73	~~75~~	73	90	93	~~96~~	93	166
7	Lisa Indriyani (INA)	A	~~71~~	~~73~~	73	73	~~91~~	91	~~96~~	91	164
8	Thelma Toua (PNG)	A	65	69	~~72~~	69	85	89	~~91~~	89	158
—	Nguyễn Thị Thúy (VIE)	A	~~78~~	78	~~81~~	78	~~107~~	~~110~~	~~110~~	—	NM

==== 53 kg ====
19 September

Rank	Athlete	Group	Snatch (kg)				Clean & Jerk (kg)				Total
Rank	Athlete	Group	1	2	3	Result	1	2	3	Result	Total
1st place, gold medalist(s)	Liao Qiuyun (CHN)	A	85	90	93	93	110	115	—	115	208
2nd place, silver medalist(s)	Hidilyn Diaz (PHI)	A	85	90	~~93~~	90	110	~~114~~	114	114	204
3rd place, bronze medalist(s)	Kristina Şermetowa (TKM)	A	83	86	89	89	107	~~112~~	~~112~~	107	196
4	Supattra Kaewkhong (THA)	A	80	83	86	86	102	~~107~~	107	107	193
5	Dika Toua (PNG)	A	74	78	~~81~~	78	100	104	108	108	186
6	Surodchana Khambao (THA)	A	75	80	~~84~~	80	95	100	105	105	185
7	Dewi Safitri (INA)	A	75	~~80~~	~~80~~	75	100	~~104~~	~~104~~	100	175
8	Mary Kini Lifu (SOL)	A	67	70	~~73~~	70	~~89~~	~~89~~	89	89	159
9	Chou Yuan-tzu (TPE)	A	65	70	~~73~~	70	85	~~90~~	~~90~~	85	155
10	Arieta Mudunavoce (FIJ)	A	~~55~~	55	~~58~~	55	70	~~74~~	~~74~~	70	125
11	Liebon Akua (NRU)	A	47	52	~~55~~	52	55	60	~~66~~	60	112
—	Fullapati Chakma (BAN)	A	~~61~~	61	~~64~~	61	~~80~~	~~80~~	~~80~~	—	NM

==== 58 kg ====
20 September

Rank	Athlete	Group	Snatch (kg)				Clean & Jerk (kg)				Total
Rank	Athlete	Group	1	2	3	Result	1	2	3	Result	Total
1st place, gold medalist(s)	Luo Xiaomin (CHN)	A	93	96	100	100	113	117	122	122	222
2nd place, silver medalist(s)	Muattar Nabieva (UZB)	A	~~90~~	90	94	94	110	114	118	118	212
3rd place, bronze medalist(s)	Acchedya Jagaddhita (INA)	A	88	91	~~94~~	91	110	113	~~118~~	113	204
4	Saule Saduakassova (KAZ)	A	83	86	89	89	108	113	~~116~~	113	202
5	Chen Wen-huei (TPE)	A	78	~~83~~	83	83	100	104	~~110~~	104	187
6	Dessa delos Santos (PHI)	A	76	80	~~83~~	80	96	100	104	104	184
7	Bägül Berdiýewa (TKM)	A	68	71	74	74	87	91	~~95~~	91	165
8	Jacinta Sumagaysay (GUM)	A	68	~~71~~	~~71~~	68	~~88~~	88	90	90	158
9	Kamala Shrestha (NEP)	A	65	~~68~~	68	68	80	~~86~~	~~86~~	80	148
10	Nilufar Jumabaýewa (TKM)	A	62	~~65~~	65	65	77	80	83	83	148
11	Maria Mareta (FIJ)	A	~~60~~	60	65	65	73	78	~~81~~	78	143
—	Jenly Tegu Wini (SOL)	A	~~80~~	~~83~~	~~83~~	—	—	—	—	—	NM

==== 63 kg ====
21 September

Rank	Athlete	Group	Snatch (kg)				Clean & Jerk (kg)				Total
Rank	Athlete	Group	1	2	3	Result	1	2	3	Result	Total
1st place, gold medalist(s)	Yuan Wangjian (CHN)	A	96	100	103	103	113	117	120	120	223
2nd place, silver medalist(s)	Mattie Sasser (MHL)	A	~~88~~	88	90	90	115	119	120	120	210
3rd place, bronze medalist(s)	An Si-sung (KOR)	A	90	94	~~97~~	94	110	114	~~117~~	114	208
4	Polina Gurýewa (TKM)	A	87	90	~~92~~	90	110	~~112~~	112	112	202
5	Elreen Ando (PHI)	A	85	90	~~93~~	90	105	~~110~~	~~110~~	105	195
6	Rodsukon Sonkaew (THA)	A	84	~~89~~	89	89	105	~~112~~	~~112~~	105	194
7	Ganzorigiin Anuujin (MGL)	A	87	~~90~~	~~92~~	87	105	~~110~~	~~113~~	105	192
8	Kao Jou-an (TPE)	A	73	76	79	79	96	101	~~105~~	101	180
9	Maximina Uepa (NRU)	A	68	71	72	72	90	~~95~~	~~95~~	90	162

==== 69 kg ====
22 September

Rank	Athlete	Group	Snatch (kg)				Clean & Jerk (kg)				Total
Rank	Athlete	Group	1	2	3	Result	1	2	3	Result	Total
1st place, gold medalist(s)	Assem Sadykova (KAZ)	A	93	96	~~100~~	96	116	126	—	126	222
2nd place, silver medalist(s)	Apolonia Vaivai (FIJ)	A	97	102	105	105	~~116~~	116	~~121~~	116	221
3rd place, bronze medalist(s)	Kristel Macrohon (PHI)	A	88	~~92~~	~~92~~	88	111	~~116~~	121	121	209
4	Gongoryn Otgontuyaa (MGL)	A	~~90~~	90	93	93	~~115~~	~~115~~	115	115	208
5	Anzhela Chalkarova (KAZ)	A	87	91	~~93~~	91	107	112	115	115	206
6	Kumushkhon Fayzullaeva (UZB)	A	83	~~87~~	87	87	107	113	~~120~~	113	200
7	Mahe Tchang (TAH)	A	80	~~85~~	~~85~~	80	~~100~~	100	102	102	182
8	Jocelyne Francken (AUS)	A	~~80~~	80	~~83~~	80	97	~~100~~	100	100	180
9	Tiiau Bakaekiri (KIR)	A	65	70	~~75~~	70	~~88~~	88	~~95~~	88	158
10	Ricci Daniel (NRU)	A	58	61	63	63	78	82	84	84	147
11	Armie Almazan (GUM)	A	62	~~65~~	~~67~~	62	72	75	~~78~~	75	137

==== 75 kg ====
23 September

Rank	Athlete	Group	Snatch (kg)				Clean & Jerk (kg)				Total
Rank	Athlete	Group	1	2	3	Result	1	2	3	Result	Total
1st place, gold medalist(s)	Mönkhjantsangiin Ankhtsetseg (MGL)	A	~~100~~	100	105	105	121	125	130	130	235
2nd place, silver medalist(s)	Omadoy Otakuziyeva (UZB)	A	95	99	101	101	120	124	130	130	231
3rd place, bronze medalist(s)	Ayumi Kamiya (JPN)	A	100	103	105	105	115	119	~~123~~	119	224
4	Valeriya Dezhnina (KAZ)	A	~~90~~	~~90~~	90	90	110	115	120	120	210
5	Wu Hsuan-min (TPE)	A	78	~~83~~	83	83	95	~~99~~	~~99~~	95	178
6	Philippa Woonton (COK)	A	68	72	~~76~~	72	85	90	~~94~~	90	162

==== 90 kg ====
24 September

Rank	Athlete	Group	Snatch (kg)				Clean & Jerk (kg)				Total
Rank	Athlete	Group	1	2	3	Result	1	2	3	Result	Total
1st place, gold medalist(s)	Eileen Cikamatana (FIJ)	A	97	104	111	111	123	134	142	142	253
2nd place, silver medalist(s)	Aýsoltan Toýçyýewa (TKM)	A	91	94	97	97	~~115~~	115	118	118	215
3rd place, bronze medalist(s)	Dolera Davronova (UZB)	A	88	91	93	93	113	117	~~123~~	117	210
4	Huda Salim (IRQ)	A	90	92	94	94	~~110~~	111	115	115	209
5	Sofia Zudova (AUS)	A	84	88	~~91~~	88	106	110	~~113~~	110	198
6	Lorraine Harry (PNG)	A	80	84	~~86~~	84	105	110	~~115~~	110	194
7	Chang Yu-hsuan (TPE)	A	80	85	~~90~~	85	100	~~107~~	107	107	192
8	Sangiza Bahtyýarowa (TKM)	A	67	70	~~73~~	70	~~87~~	87	~~91~~	87	157

==== +90 kg ====
25 September

Rank	Athlete	Group	Snatch (kg)				Clean & Jerk (kg)				Total
Rank	Athlete	Group	1	2	3	Result	1	2	3	Result	Total
1st place, gold medalist(s)	Jia Weipeng (CHN)	A	110	115	120	120	140	146	150	150	270
2nd place, silver medalist(s)	Alexandra Aborneva (KAZ)	A	100	105	~~110~~	105	135	140	143	143	248
3rd place, bronze medalist(s)	Iuniarra Sipaia (SAM)	A	101	106	~~109~~	106	135	~~141~~	~~143~~	135	241
4	Jeon Seol-hee (KOR)	A	~~102~~	102	~~107~~	102	134	~~139~~	~~139~~	134	236
5	Feagaiga Stowers (SAM)	A	100	~~105~~	~~107~~	100	128	134	~~140~~	134	234
6	Luisa Peters (COK)	A	95	~~100~~	100	100	120	~~125~~	~~125~~	120	220
