= Palau at the 2017 Asian Indoor and Martial Arts Games =

- IOC code: PLW
- NOC: Palau National Olympic Committee
- Website: www.oceaniasport.com/palau

in Ashgabat 17–27 September
- Competitors: 10 in 3 sports
- Medals: Gold 0 Silver 0 Bronze 0 Total 0

Asian Indoor and Martial Arts Games appearances
- 2017; 2021; 2025

Palau competed at the 2017 Asian Indoor and Martial Arts Games held in Ashgabat, Turkmenistan from September 17 to 27. 10 participants competed in 3 different sports. Palau did not win any medals in the multi-sport event.

Palau made its debut in an Asian Indoor and Martial Arts Games for the first time at the multi-sport event held in Turkmenistan along with other Oceania nations.

== Participants ==
Sport	Men	Women	Total
Indoor Athletics	1	1	2
Short course swimming	2	2	4
Wrestling	4	0	4
