= Swimming at the 2022 Asian Games – Men's 100 metre butterfly =

Men's 100 metre butterfly at the 2022 Asian Games
- Venue: Hangzhou Olympic Expo Aquatics Center
- Date: 27 September 2023
- Competitors: 29 from 21 nations

Medalists
gold medal	Katsuhiro Matsumoto	Japan
silver medal	Wang Changhao	China
bronze medal	Adilbek Mussin	Kazakhstan

The men's 100 metre butterfly event at the 2022 Asian Games took place on 27 September 2023 at the Hangzhou Olympic Expo Center.

== Schedule ==
All times are China Standard Time (UTC+08:00)

Date	Time	Event
Wednesday, 27 September 2023	10:14	Heats
Wednesday, 27 September 2023	19:36	Final

== Records ==
Prior to this competition, the existing world, Asian and Games records were as follows.

World Record	Caeleb Dressel (USA)	49.45	Tokyo, Japan	31 July 2021
Asian Record	Joseph Schooling (SGP)	50.39	Rio de Janeiro, Brazil	12 August 2016
Games Record	Joseph Schooling (SGP)	51.04	Jakarta, Indonesia	22 August 2018

== Results ==
=== Heats ===
Rank	Heat	Athlete	Time	Notes
1	2	Wang Changhao (CHN)	51.55	
2	4	Katsuhiro Matsumoto (JPN)	51.88	
3	4	Adilbek Mussin (KAZ)	51.98	
4	3	Kim Young-beom (KOR)	52.11	
5	2	Quah Zheng Wen (SGP)	52.31	
6	3	Naoki Mizunuma (JPN)	52.77	
7	4	Eldorbek Usmonov (UZB)	52.85	
8	3	Kim Ji-hun (KOR)	52.91	
9	3	Sun Jiajun (CHN)	52.93	
10	3	Bryan Leong (MAS)	53.26	
11	4	Navaphat Wongcharoen (THA)	53.69	
12	2	Jarod Hatch (PHI)	53.70	
13	4	Mehrshad Afghari (IRI)	54.07	
14	2	Ng Cheuk Yin (HKG)	54.26	
15	4	Joe Kurniawan (INA)	54.40	
16	3	Waleed Abdulrazzaq (KUW)	54.62	
17	2	Surasit Thongdeang (THA)	54.78	
18	2	Nicholas Lim (HKG)	54.80	
19	4	Tameem El-Hamayda (QAT)	55.64	
20	3	Jerald Lium (SGP)	56.50	
21	2	Mohamed Ismail (QAT)	57.62	
22	2	Lam Chi Chong (MAC)	58.60	
23	1	Arslan Gaýypnazarow (TKM)	58.80	
24	4	Abdulrahman Al-Kulaibi (OMA)	59.45	
25	1	Mohamed Rihan Shiham (MDV)	1:02.41	
26	3	Azhar Abbas (PAK)	1:02.70	
27	1	Saddam Ramziyorzoda (TJK)	1:03.01	
28	1	Kinley Lhendup (BHU)	1:03.38	
29	1	Ahmed Neeq Niyaz (MDV)	1:10.30	

=== Final ===
Rank	Athlete	Time	Notes
1st place, gold medalist(s)	Katsuhiro Matsumoto (JPN)	51.13	
2nd place, silver medalist(s)	Wang Changhao (CHN)	51.24	
3rd place, bronze medalist(s)	Adilbek Mussin (KAZ)	51.86	
4	Naoki Mizunuma (JPN)	51.97	
5	Kim Young-beom (KOR)	52.19	
6	Quah Zheng Wen (SGP)	52.26	
7	Kim Ji-hun (KOR)	52.79	
8	Eldorbek Usmonov (UZB)	52.81	
