= Tonga at the 2017 Asian Indoor and Martial Arts Games =

- IOC code: TGA
- NOC: Tonga Sports Association and National Olympic Committee
- Website: www.oceaniasport.com/tonga

in Ashgabat 17–27 September
- Competitors: 9 in 3 sports
- Medals: Gold 0 Silver 0 Bronze 0 Total 0

Asian Indoor and Martial Arts Games appearances
- 2017; 2021; 2026

Tonga competed at the 2017 Asian Indoor and Martial Arts Games held in Ashgabat, Turkmenistan from September 17 to 27. Tonga sent a delegation consisting of 9 competitors in the multi-sport event and the nation finished the competition without receiving any medals.

Tonga made its debut in an Asian Indoor and Martial Arts Games for the first time at the Games held in Turkmenistan along with other Oceania nations.

== Participants ==
Sport	Men	Women	Total
Short course swimming	2	2	4
Taekwondo	2	2	4
Weightlifting	1	0	1
