= Fiji at the 2017 Asian Indoor and Martial Arts Games =

- IOC code: FIJ
- NOC: Fiji Association of Sports and National Olympic Committee
- Website: www.fijiolympiccommittee.com

in Ashgabat 17–27 September
- Competitors: 28 in 4 sports
- Medals: Gold 1 Silver 1 Bronze 0 Total 2

Asian Indoor and Martial Arts Games appearances
- 2017; 2021; 2025

Fiji competed at the 2017 Asian Indoor and Martial Arts Games held in Ashgabat, Turkmenistan. 28 athletes competed in 4 different sports. Fijian team won 2 medals including one gold and a silver medal in the Games.

Fiji also made its first appearance at an Asian Indoor and Martial Arts Games event along with other Oceania nations including Australia.

== Participants ==
| Sport | Men | Women | Total |
|---|---|---|---|
| Indoor Athletics | 5 | 5 | 10 |
| Indoor Tennis | 3 | 2 | 5 |
| Short course swimming | 4 | 2 | 6 |
| Weightlifting | 3 | 4 | 7 |

== Medallists ==
| Medal | Name | Sport | Event |
|---|---|---|---|
| Gold | Eileen Cikamatana | Weightlifting | Women's 90 kg |
| Silver | Apolonia Vaivai | Weightlifting | Women's 69 kg |
