= Timor-Leste at the 2017 Asian Indoor and Martial Arts Games =

- IOC code: TLS
- NOC: National Olympic Committee of East Timor

in Ashgabat 17–27 September
- Competitors: 1 in 1 sport
- Medals: Gold 0 Silver 0 Bronze 0 Total 0

Asian Indoor and Martial Arts Games appearances
- 2017; 2021; 2025

East Timor competed at the 2017 Asian Indoor and Martial Arts Games held in Ashgabat, Turkmenistan from 17 to 27 September. East Timor sent only one participant in the multi-sport event for short course swimming. East Timor couldn't receive any medal in the competition.

East Timor made its debut appearance in an Asian Indoor and Martial Arts Games for the first time in history along with other Oceania nations.

== Participants ==
Sport	Men	Women	Total
Short course swimming	0	1	1

Sport	Name	Events
Short course swimming	Ximenes Belo Imelda Felicyta	Women's 50m freestyle, Women's 100m freestyle
