= Federated States of Micronesia at the 2017 Asian Indoor and Martial Arts Games =

- IOC code: FSM
- NOC: Federated States of Micronesia National Olympic Committee
- Website: www.oceaniasport.com/fsm

in Ashgabat 17–27 September
- Competitors: 11 in 3 sports
- Medals: Gold 0 Silver 0 Bronze 0 Total 0

Asian Indoor and Martial Arts Games appearances
- 2017; 2021; 2026

Federated States of Micronesia competed at the 2017 Asian Indoor and Martial Arts Games held in Ashgabat, Turkmenistan. They did not win any medals at the event.

Federated States of Micronesia made its first appearance at an Asian Indoor and Martial Arts Games along with other Oceania nations.
