= Saudi Arabia at the 2017 Asian Indoor and Martial Arts Games =

- Flag of Saudi Arabia
- IOC code: KSA

Asian Indoor and Martial Arts Games appearances
- 2007; 2009; 2013; 2017; 2021; 2025

Saudi Arabia competed at the 2017 Asian Indoor and Martial Arts Games held in Ashgabat, Turkmenistan.

== Medal summary ==
=== Medalists ===
Medal	Name	Sport	Event
Gold	Ahmed Al-Muwallad	Indoor athletics	Men's 60 m hurdles
Gold	Mohammed Al-Qaree	Indoor athletics	Men's heptathlon
Silver	Mazen Al-Yasen	Indoor athletics	Men's 400 m
Silver	Mohammed Shaween	Indoor athletics	Men's 1500 m
Silver	Tariq Al-Amri	Indoor athletics	Men's 3000 m
Bronze	Mahmoud Al-Humayd	Weightlifting	Men's 69 kg
