= Papua New Guinea at the 2017 Asian Indoor and Martial Arts Games =

- IOC code: PNG
- NOC: Papua New Guinea Sports Federation and Olympic Committee
- Website: www.oceaniasport.com/png

in Ashgabat 17–27 September
- Competitors: 9 in 2 sports
- Medals: Gold 0 Silver 0 Bronze 0 Total 0

Asian Indoor and Martial Arts Games appearances
- 2017; 2021; 2025

Papua New Guinea competed at the 2017 Asian Indoor and Martial Arts Games held in Ashgabat, Turkmenistan from September 17 to 27. Papua New Guinea sent a delegation consisting of 9 athletes competing in 2 different sports. Papua New Guinea didn't receive any medal at the multi-sport event.

Papua New Guinea made its debut in an Asian Indoor and Martial Arts Games for the first time at the Games held in Turkmenistan along with other Oceania nations.

== Participants ==
| Sport | Men | Women | Total |
|---|---|---|---|
| Short course swimming | 3 | 0 | 3 |
| Wrestling | 3 | 3 | 6 |
