= Adilbek Mussin =

Kazakhstani swimmer (born 1999)

Personal information
- Native name: Әділбек Рүстемұлы Мусин
- Born: 4 October 1999 (age 26)
- Height: 189 cm (6 ft 2 in)

Sport
- Sport: Swimming
Medal record
Men's swimming
Representing Kazakhstan
Asian Championships
Gold medal – first place	2025 Ahmedabad	50 m butterfly
Asian Games
Bronze medal – third place	2018 Jakarta-Palembang	50 m butterfly
Bronze medal – third place	2018 Jakarta-Palembang	4×100 m medley
Bronze medal – third place	2022 Hangzhou	50 m butterfly
Bronze medal – third place	2022 Hangzhou	100 m butterfly
Islamic Solidarity Games
Gold medal – first place	2021 Konya	50 m butterfly
Gold medal – first place	2021 Konya	100 m butterfly
Bronze medal – third place	2021 Konya	4×100 m medley
World University Games
Bronze medal – third place	2021 Chengdu	100 m butterfly
Asian Indoor and Martial Arts Games
Bronze medal – third place	2017 Ashgabat	4×50 m medley
Bronze medal – third place	2017 Ashgabat	4×100 m medley

Ädılbek Rüstemūly Musin (Note: Often transliterated as Adilbek Rustemovich Mussin through a Russified Romanization of Адильбек Рустемович Мусин.) (Kazakh: Әділбек Рүстемұлы Мусин, born 4 October 1999) is a Kazakhstani swimmer. He competed in the men's 50 metre butterfly event at the 2017 World Aquatics Championships. In 2018, he won the bronze medal both in the men's 50 metre butterfly and the men's 4 × 100 metre medley relay events at the 2018 Asian Games held in Jakarta, Indonesia.

== Results ==
- Swimming at the 2024 Summer Olympics – Men's 100 metre butterfly - 29th
- Swimming at the 2024 Summer Olympics – Men's 100 metre freestyle - 41st
