= Artyom Kozlyuk =

Uzbekistani swimmer (born 1998)

Personal information
- Born: 15 July 1998 (age 27)

Sport
- Sport: Swimming

Artyom Kozlyuk (born 15 July 1998) is an Uzbekistani swimmer. He competed in the men's 50 metre butterfly event at the 2017 World Aquatics Championships held in Budapest, Hungary.
