= Sun Meichen =

Chinese swimmer (born 1998)

Personal information
- Nationality: Chinese
- Born: 1 November 1998 (age 27) Cangzhou, Hebei, China

Sport
- Sport: Swimming

Sun Meichen (born 1 November 1998) is a Chinese swimmer. She competed in the women's 4 × 100 metre freestyle relay event at the 2016 Summer Olympics.
