= Abdul Aziz Al-Obaidly =

Qatari swimmer (born 2001)

Personal information
- Nationality: Qatari
- Born: 28 September 2001 (age 23); Doha, Qatar

Sport
- Sport: Swimming

Abdul Aziz Al-Obaidly (born 28 September 2001) is a Qatari swimmer. He competed in the men's 200 metre breaststroke at the 2020 Summer Olympics.
