= Wang Lizhuo =

Chinese swimmer (born 1998)

Personal information
- Nationality: Chinese
- Born: 18 April 1998 (age 28)

Sport
- Sport: Swimming

Wang Lizhuo (born 18 April 1998) is a Chinese swimmer. He competed in the men's 100 metre breaststroke at the 2019 World Aquatics Championships.
