= Ilya Musin (ice hockey) =

Russian ice hockey player

- Born: February 3, 1991 (age 34); Novokuznetsk, Russia
- Height: 6 ft 1 in (185 cm)
- Weight: 190 lb (86 kg; 13 st 8 lb)
- Position: Forward
- Shoots: Left
- KHL team: Metallurg Novokuznetsk
- Playing career: 2010–present

Ilya Musin (born February 3, 1991) is a Russian professional ice hockey player. He is currently playing with Metallurg Novokuznetsk of the Kontinental Hockey League (KHL)

Musin made his Kontinental Hockey League debut playing with Metallurg Novokuznetsk during the 2010–11 KHL season.
