= Alexandr Varakin =

Kazakhstani swimmer (born 1996)

Personal information
- Nationality: Kazakhstani
- Born: 17 February 1996 (age 30)

Sport
- Sport: Swimming
Medal record
Men's swimming
Representing Kazakhstan
Asian Games
Bronze medal – third place	2018 Jakarta-Palembang	4×100 m medley
Islamic Solidarity Games
Bronze medal – third place	2021 Konya	4×100 m medley

Alexandr Varakin (Александр Сергеевич Варакин, born 17 February 1996) is a Kazakhstani swimmer. He competed in the men's 50 metre freestyle event at the 2018 FINA World Swimming Championships (25 m), in Hangzhou, China.
