= Diana Nazarova =

Kazakhstani swimmer

Personal information
- Born: 2 June 2000 (age 26)
- Height: 178 cm (5 ft 10 in)
- Weight: 55 kg (121 lb)

Sport
- Sport: Swimming

Diana Nazarova (Диана Назарова, born 2 June 2000) is a Kazakhstani swimmer.

In 2019, she represented Kazakhstan at the 2019 World Aquatics Championships held in Gwangju, South Korea. She competed in the women's 50 metre backstroke and women's 100 metre backstroke events.
