= Lao Lihui =

Chinese swimmer

Personal information
- Born: 4 April 2001 (age 25)

Sport
- Sport: Swimming
- Strokes: Freestyle
Medal record
Women's swimming
Representing China
Asian Games
Silver medal – second place	2018 Jakarta-Palembang	4×100 m freestyle

Lao Lihui (born 4 April 2001) is a Chinese swimmer. She competed in the women's 4 × 100 metre freestyle relay event at the 2018 Asian Games, winning the silver medal.
