= Sina Gholampour =

Iranian swimmer (born 1999)

Personal information
- Nationality: Iranian
- Born: 16 September 1999 (age 26) Mashhad, Iran

Sport
- Sport: Swimming
Medal record
Men's swimming
Representing Iran
Islamic Solidarity Games
Bronze medal – third place	2021 Konya	4×100 m freestyle

Sina Gholampour (Persian: سینا غلام‌پور; born 16 September 1999) is an Iranian swimmer. He competed in the men's 50 metre freestyle event at the 2018 FINA World Swimming Championships (25 m), in Hangzhou, China. In the same year, he also represented Iran at the 2018 Asian Games held in Jakarta, Indonesia.
