= Adil Kaskabay =

Kazakhstani swimmer (born 1998)

Personal information
- Nationality: Kazakhstani
- Born: 13 May 1998 (age 28)

Sport
- Sport: Swimming
Medal record
Representing Kazakhstan
Asian Games
Bronze medal – third place	2018 Jakarta	4×100 m medley
Asian Indoor and Martial Arts Games
Gold medal – first place	2017 Ashgabat	50 m freestyle
Gold medal – first place	2017 Ashgabat	100 m freestyle
Silver medal – second place	2017 Ashgabat	100 m backstroke
Bronze medal – third place	2017 Ashgabat	4×50 m medley
Bronze medal – third place	2017 Ashgabat	4×100 m medley

Adil Kaskabay (Әділ Ардақұлы Қасқабай, born 13 May 1998) is a Kazakhstani swimmer. He competed in the men's 100 metre freestyle event at the 2017 World Aquatics Championships. In 2018, he won the bronze medal in the men's 4 × 100 metre medley relay event at the 2018 Asian Games held in Jakarta, Indonesia.
