= Moon Jae-kwon =

South Korean swimmer (born 1998)

Personal information
- Born: 25 March 1998 (age 28)

Sport
- Sport: Swimming
Medal record
Men's swimming
Representing South Korea
Asian Games
Bronze medal – third place	2018 Jakarta	4×100 m mixed medley

Moon Jae-kwon (born 25 March 1998) is a South Korean swimmer. In 2018, he won the bronze medal in the mixed 4 × 100 metre medley relay event at the 2018 Asian Games held in Jakarta, Indonesia.

In 2019, he represented South Korea at the 2019 World Aquatics Championships in Gwangju, South Korea. He competed in the men's 50 metre breaststroke and men's 100 metre breaststroke events. He also competed in two relay events: the men's 4 × 100 metre medley relay and 4 × 100 metre mixed medley relay.
