= Iran at the Asian Games =

- IOC code: IRI
- NOC: National Olympic Committee of the Islamic Republic of Iran
- Medals Ranked 4th: Gold 211 Silver 220 Bronze 232 Total 663

Summer appearances
- 1951; 1954; 1958; 1962; 1966; 1970; 1974; 1978; 1982; 1986; 1990; 1994; 1998; 2002; 2006; 2010; 2014; 2018; 2022; 2026

Winter appearances
- 1990; 1996; 1999; 2003; 2007; 2011; 2017; 2025; 2029

Iran first participated at the Asian Games in 1951, and has sent athletes to compete in every Asian Games since then, except for 1954, 1962 and 1978.

The National Olympic Committee for Iran is the National Olympic Committee of the Islamic Republic of Iran, and was founded in 1947.

Iran's best performance was in 1974, when the country hosted the event in Tehran, it ranked second with 36 gold, 28 silver and 17 bronze medals.

== Medals by games ==
=== Asian Games ===
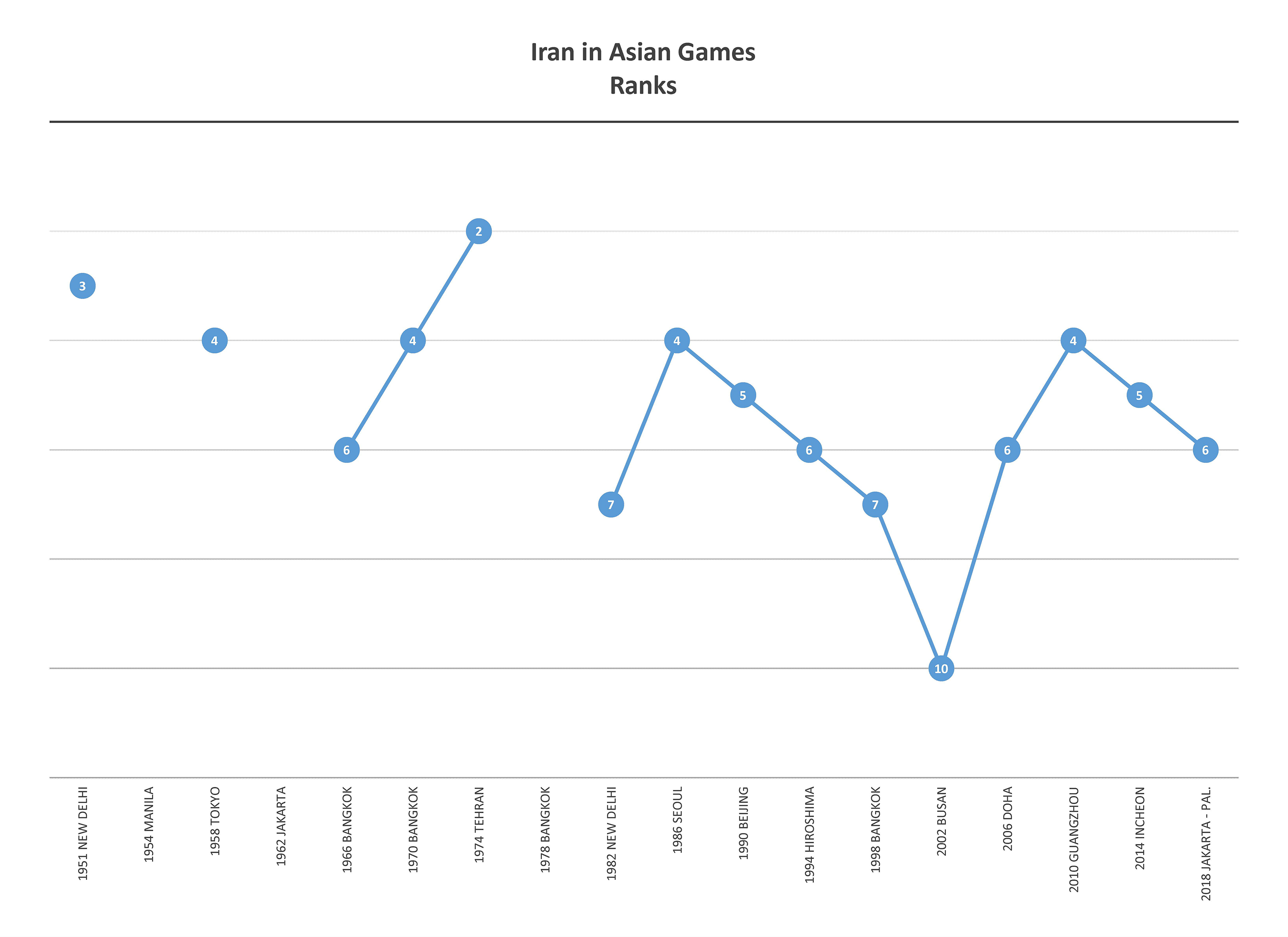
Iran Ranks in Various Asian Games

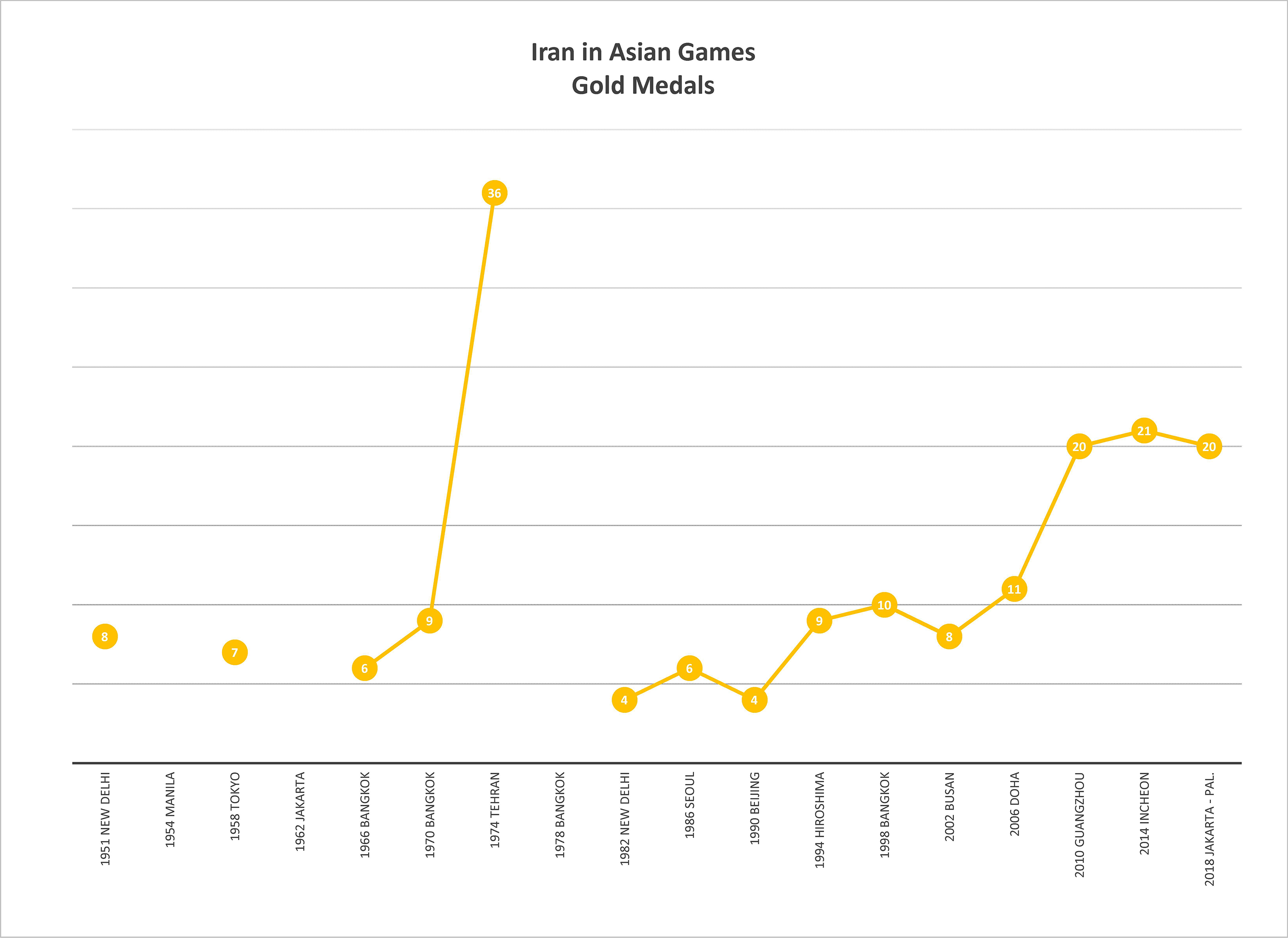
Iran Gold Medals Count in Various Asian Games

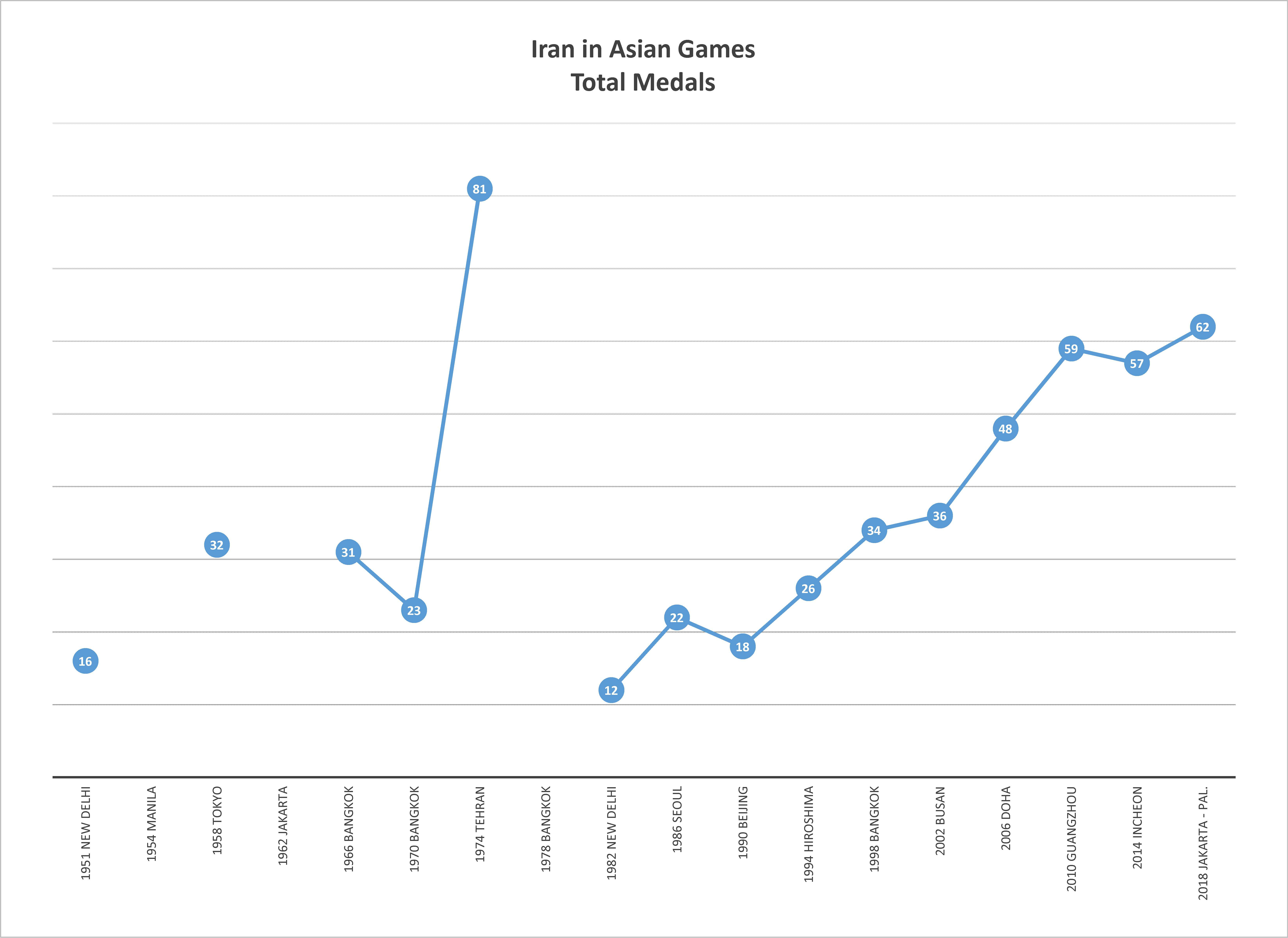
Iran Total Medals Count in Various Asian Games

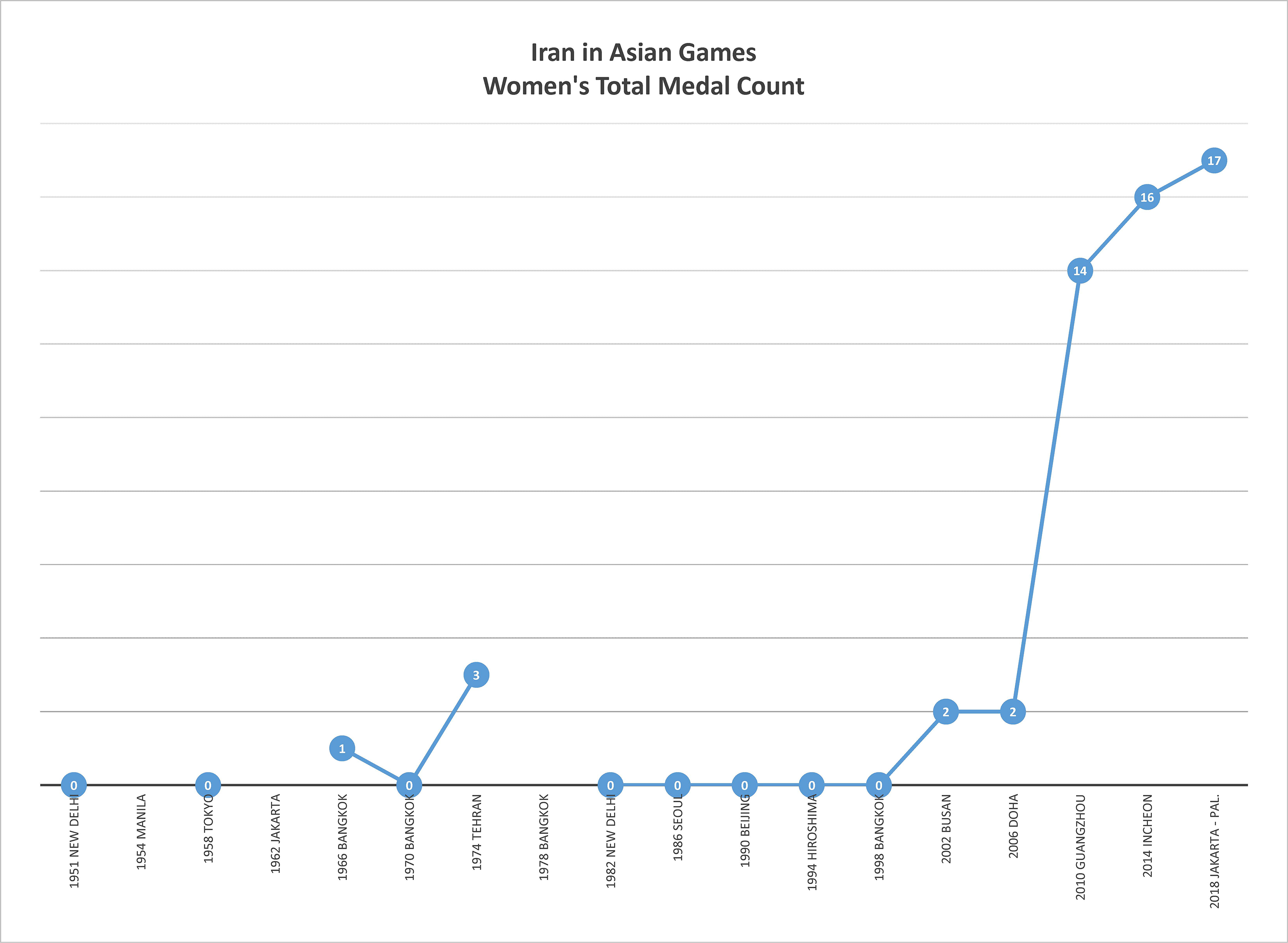
Total Medals Count won by Iranian Female Athletes in Various Asian Games Events

Games	Athletes	Gold	Silver	Bronze	Total	Rank
(India) 1951 New Delhi	49	8	6	2	16	3
(Philippines) 1954 Manila	did not participate					
(Japan) 1958 Tokyo	83	7	14	11	32	4
(Indonesia) 1962 Jakarta	did not participate					
(Thailand) 1966 Bangkok	254	6	8	17	31	6
(Thailand) 1970 Bangkok	102	9	7	7	23	4
(Iran) 1974 Tehran	314	36	28	17	81	2
(Thailand) 1978 Bangkok	did not participate					
(India) 1982 New Delhi	43	4	4	4	12	7
(South Korea) 1986 Seoul	94	6	6	10	22	4
(China) 1990 Beijing	128	4	6	8	18	5
(Japan) 1994 Hiroshima	162	9	9	8	26	6
(Thailand) 1998 Bangkok	318	10	11	13	34	7
(South Korea) 2002 Busan	126	8	14	14	36	10
(Qatar) 2006 Doha	239	11	15	22	48	6
(China) 2010 Guangzhou	359	20	15	24	59	4
(South Korea) 2014 Incheon	282	21	18	18	57	5
(Indonesia) 2018 Jakarta–Palembang	378	20	20	22	62	6
(China) 2022 Hangzhou	289	13	21	20	54	7
(Japan) 2026 Aichi–Nagoya	305	19	18	15	52	6
Total	3,525	211	220	232	663	4

=== Asian Winter Games ===
Games	Athletes	Gold	Silver	Bronze	Total	Rank
(Japan) 1986 Sapporo	did not participate					
(Japan) 1990 Sapporo	10	0	0	0	0	—
(China) 1996 Harbin	6	0	0	0	0	—
(South Korea) 1999 Kangwon	11	0	0	0	0	—
(Japan) 2003 Aomori	16	0	0	0	0	—
(China) 2007 Changchun	14	0	0	0	0	—
(Kazakhstan) 2011 Astana–Almaty	10	0	1	2	3	6
(Japan) 2017 Sapporo	10	0	0	0	0	—
(China) 2025 Harbin	14	0	0	0	0	—
Total	91	0	1	2	3	10

=== Asian Indoor and Martial Arts Games ===
Games	Athletes	Gold	Silver	Bronze	Total	Rank
(Thailand) 2005 Bangkok	47	3	5	2	10	11
2007 Macau	133	4	4	9	17	8
(Thailand) 2009 Bangkok	did not participate					
(Vietnam) 2009 Hanoi	131	17	15	13	45	5
(South Korea) 2013 Incheon	82	3	6	2	11	6
(Turkmenistan) 2017 Ashgabat	207	36	23	59	118	3
(Saudi Arabia) 2026 Riyadh						
Total	590	63	53	85	201	7

=== Asian Beach Games ===
Games	Athletes	Gold	Silver	Bronze	Total	Rank
(Indonesia) 2008 Bali	10	0	0	0	0	—
(Oman) 2010 Muscat	18	0	0	2	2	21
(China) 2012 Haiyang	23	2	0	0	2	7
(Thailand) 2014 Phuket	86	9	14	8	31	4
(Vietnam) 2016 Da Nang	33	9	6	6	21	4
(China) 2026 Sanya	57	9	1	0	10	3
Total	227	29	21	16	66	5

=== Asian Youth Games ===
Games	Athletes	Gold	Silver	Bronze	Total	Rank
2009 Singapore	54	1	3	2	6	11
(China) 2013 Nanjing	79	0	6	2	8	20
(Bahrain) 2025 Manama	238	22	18	36	76	4
Total	371	23	27	40	90	6

== Medals by sport ==
=== Asian Games ===
Sport	Gold	Silver	Bronze	Total
Aquatics, Diving	0	1	3	4
Aquatics, Water polo	1	0	1	2
Archery	1	0	2	3
Athletics	13	16	10	39
Basketball	0	2	3	5
Basketball, 3x3	0	0	1	1
Boxing	5	11	26	42
Canoeing, Slalom	0	0	1	1
Canoeing, Sprint	1	5	8	14
Chess	1	0	1	2
Cycling, Mountain bike	0	0	1	1
Cycling, Road	3	5	6	14
Cycling, Track	2	5	8	15
Equestrian	0	0	1	1
Fencing	3	6	9	18
Football	4	2	1	7
Gymnastics, Artistic	0	1	0	1
Handball	0	1	1	2
Judo	1	8	11	20
Kabaddi	2	4	2	8
Karate	15	11	12	38
Kurash	2	4	3	9
Pencak silat	0	0	1	1
Roller sports, Inline freestyle	0	1	0	1
Rowing	2	5	5	12
Shooting	1	4	4	9
Sport climbing	2	0	0	2
Table tennis	0	0	5	5
Taekwondo	14	17	23	54
Tennis	0	2	2	4
Volleyball	3	3	2	8
Weightlifting	33	31	20	84
Wrestling	74	44	37	155
Wushu	9	13	7	29
Total	192	202	217	611

=== Asian Winter Games ===
Sport	Gold	Silver	Bronze	Total
Ski orienteering	0	1	1	2
Skiing, Alpine	0	0	1	1
Total	0	1	2	3

=== Asian Indoor and Martial Arts Games ===
Sport	Gold	Silver	Bronze	Total
3x3 basketball	1	0	0	1
Chess	1	2	3	6
Cue sports	1	3	2	6
Cycling, Track	1	1	1	3
Equestrian	0	0	1	1
Esports	2	2	3	7
Futsal	5	1	1	7
Indoor archery	3	1	4	8
Indoor athletics	5	5	7	17
Indoor hockey	1	0	0	1
Ju-jitsu	1	2	2	5
Kabaddi	0	3	1	4
Kickboxing	7	4	5	16
Kurash	4	5	6	15
Muaythai	7	6	6	19
Pencak silat	0	2	1	3
Sambo	0	0	3	3
Sepak takraw	0	0	1	1
Short course swimming	1	1	1	3
Sport climbing	0	0	1	1
Taekwondo	7	2	4	13
Vovinam	1	3	3	7
Weightlifting	1	1	2	4
Wrestling	9	3	4	16
Wrestling, Alysh	1	1	10	12
Wrestling, Belt	0	1	8	9
Wrestling, Pahlavani	3	0	0	3
Wrestling, Turkmen goresh	0	1	5	6
Wushu	1	3	0	4
Total	63	53	85	201

=== Asian Beach Games ===
Sport	Gold	Silver	Bronze	Total
Aquatics, 4x4 water polo	1	1	0	2
Beach athletics	3	3	1	7
Beach handball	1	0	0	1
Beach kabaddi	3	0	1	4
Beach kurash	3	3	2	8
Beach sambo	0	2	2	4
Beach sepak takraw	0	0	2	2
Beach soccer	3	0	1	4
Beach volleyball	0	2	0	2
Beach wrestling	9	1	0	10
Bodybuilding	1	1	0	2
Footvolley	0	1	0	1
Ju-jitsu	0	3	3	6
Muaythai	3	2	1	6
Pencak silat	0	1	1	2
Vocotruyen	2	1	1	4
Vovinam	0	0	1	1
Total	29	21	16	66

=== Asian Youth Games ===
Sport	Gold	Silver	Bronze	Total
3x3 basketball	0	2	0	2
Aquatics, Swimming	2	0	0	2
Athletics	1	5	4	10
Boxing	0	2	4	6
Esports	0	0	1	1
Football	0	1	1	2
Futsal	1	1	0	2
Handball	1	0	0	1
Judo	1	0	5	6
Kabaddi	0	2	0	2
Kurash	0	2	2	4
Mixed martial arts	4	1	2	7
Muaythai	2	2	5	9
Pencak silat	0	0	1	1
Shooting	0	1	0	1
Table tennis	0	0	1	1
Taekwondo	3	3	6	12
Volleyball	2	0	0	2
Weightlifting	1	2	6	9
Wrestling	3	1	2	6
Wrestling, Beach	2	2	0	4
Total	23	27	40	90

== West Asian Games ==
Games	Gold	Silver	Bronze	Total	Rank
(Iran) 1997 Tehran	63	37	56	156	1
2002 Kuwait City	9	11	16	36	3
(Qatar) 2005 Doha	20	25	16	61	3
Total	92	73	88	253	1

Sport	Gold	Silver	Bronze	Total
Aquatics, Diving	2	2	3	7
Aquatics, Swimming	6	6	11	23
Athletics	15	18	22	55
Badminton	3	3	6	12
Basketball	1	0	0	1
Boxing	7	2	3	12
Fencing	7	9	9	25
Football	1	1	1	3
Gymnastics	2	6	5	13
Handball	0	1	0	1
Judo	3	2	1	6
Karate	11	7	11	29
Shooting	5	5	7	17
Table tennis	3	2	3	8
Taekwondo	6	1	1	8
Tennis	3	0	2	5
Volleyball	0	1	0	1
Weightlifting	8	3	1	12
Wrestling	9	4	2	15
Total	92	73	88	253

== Multiple gold medalists ==
This is a list of multiple Asian Games gold medalists for Iran, listing people who have won at least three medals including at least two gold medals.

Athletes in bold are still active.

Athlete	Sport	Asian Games	Gold	Silver	Bronze	Total
Mohammad Nassiri	Weightlifting	1966–1974	4	1	0	5
Ehsan Haddadi	Athletics	2006–2022	4	1	0	5
Moslem Eskandar-Filabi	Wrestling	1966–1974	4	0	0	4
Reza Soukhtehsaraei	Wrestling	1974–1990	3	1	0	4
Mohammad Mousavi	Volleyball	2010–2022	3	1	0	4
Mohsen Mohammadseifi	Wushu	2010–2022	3	1	0	4
Houshang Kargarnejad	Weightlifting	1970–1974	3	0	1	4
Behdad Salimi	Weightlifting	2010–2018	3	0	0	3
Alireza Heidari	Wrestling	1998–2006	3	0	0	3
Reza Yazdani	Wrestling	2006–2014	3	0	0	3
Jalal Keshmiri	Athletics	1966–1974	2	3	1	6
Hassan Arianfard	Cycling	1970–1974	2	1	1	4
Jasem Vishkaei	Karate	2002–2010	2	1	0	3
Akbar Shokrollahi	Weightlifting	1974	2	1	0	3
Ali Vali	Weightlifting	1974	2	1	0	3
Saeid Marouf	Volleyball	2010–2018	2	1	0	3
Teymour Ghiasi	Athletics	1966–1974	2	0	1	3
Hossein Rezazadeh	Weightlifting	1998–2006	2	0	1	3

== List of flag bearers ==
Event year	Flag bearer	Sport
1951	Ahmad Ordoubadi	Weightlifting
1958	Mahmoud Namjoo	Weightlifting
1966	Mansour Mehdizadeh	Wrestling
1970	Abdollah Movahed	Weightlifting
1974	Moslem Eskandar-Filabi	Wrestling
1982	Reza Soukhtehsaraei	Wrestling
1986	Reza Soukhtehsaraei	Wrestling
1990	Alireza Lorestani	Wrestling
1994	Amir Reza Khadem	Wrestling
1998	Zahra Mahroughi	Shooting
2002	Ali Daei	Football
2006	Hossein Rezazadeh	Weightlifting
2010	Samad Nikkhah Bahrami	Basketball
2014	Behdad Salimi	Weightlifting
2018	Elaheh Ahmadi	Shooting
2022	Javad Foroughi; Nahid Kiani	Shooting; Taekwondo
2026	Fazel Atrachali; Zahra Kiani	Kabaddi; Wushu
