= United Arab Emirates at the Asian Games =

- IOC code: UAE
- NOC: United Arab Emirates National Olympic Committee
- Medals Ranked 24th: Gold 19 Silver 27 Bronze 28 Total 74

Summer appearances
- 1978; 1982; 1986; 1990; 1994; 1998; 2002; 2006; 2010; 2014; 2018; 2022; 2026

Winter appearances
- 2007; 2011; 2017; 2025; 2029

United Arab Emirates first competed at the Asian Games in 1978.

== Medal tables ==
=== Medals by Games ===
| Games | Rank | Gold | Silver | Bronze | Total |
|---|---|---|---|---|---|
| 1978 Bangkok | – | 0 | 0 | 0 | 0 |
| 1982 New Delhi | – | 0 | 0 | 0 | 0 |
| 1986 Seoul | – | 0 | 0 | 0 | 0 |
| 1990 Beijing | – | 0 | 0 | 0 | 0 |
| 1994 Hiroshima | 25 | 0 | 1 | 3 | 4 |
| 1998 Bangkok | 29 | 0 | 0 | 1 | 1 |
| 2002 Busan | 30 | 0 | 2 | 1 | 3 |
| 2006 Doha | 20 | 3 | 4 | 3 | 10 |
| 2010 Guangzhou | 30 | 0 | 4 | 1 | 5 |
| 2014 Incheon | 25 | 1 | 0 | 3 | 4 |
| 2018 Jakarta | 20 | 3 | 6 | 5 | 14 |
| 2022 Hangzhou | 16 | 5 | 5 | 10 | 20 |
| 2026 Aichi-Nagoya | 13 | 7 | 5 | 1 | 13 |
| Total | 24 | 19 | 27 | 28 | 74 |
