= Tennis at the 2017 Pacific Mini Games =

Tennis at the 2017 Pacific Mini Games in Port Vila, Vanuatu was held on December 4–15, 2017.

== Medal summary ==
=== Medal table ===
* Host nation (Vanuatu)

Rank	Nation	Gold	Silver	Bronze	Total
1	New Caledonia	3	1	1	5
2	Vanuatu*	2	1	2	5
3	Samoa	2	1	1	4
4	Fiji	0	2	0	2
4	Solomon Islands	0	2	0	2
6	Tonga	0	0	2	2
7	Papua New Guinea	0	0	1	1
Totals (7 entries)		7	7	7	21

=== Men's ===
Event	Gold	Silver	Bronze	Refs
Men's singles	Julien Delaplane; New Caledonia	Cyril Jacobe; Vanuatu	Matthew Dean Tui Stubbings; Papua New Guinea	
Women's singles	Steffi Carruthers; Samoa	Geojimah Sauramoniabu Row; Solomon Islands	Rosalie Molbaleh; Vanuatu	
Men's doubles	Vanuatu; Cyril Jacobe; Aymeric Mara	Fiji; William O'Connell; Conway Jabez Kaitu'U Beg	New Caledonia; Julien Delaplane; Maceo Rouas	
Women's doubles	Samoa; Steffi Carruthers; Lyla Saolo Tapusoa	New Caledonia; Samuelle Bull; Meryl Pydo	Vanuatu; Rosalie Molbaleh; Marie Hyacinthe Liwuslili	
Mixed doubles	New Caledonia; Julien Delaplane; Samuelle Bull	Samoa; Leon Valnul Soonalole; Steffi Carruthers	Tonga; Matavao Fanguna; Brookie Maasi	
Men's team	Vanuatu; Aymeric Mara; Cyril Jacobe	Fiji; William O'Connell; Conway Jabez Kaitu'U Beg	Tonga; Matavao Fanguna; Semisi Fanguna	
Women's team	New Caledonia; Samuelle Bull; Meryl Pydo	Solomon Islands; Geojimah Row; Vinda Teally	Samoa; Steffi Carruthers; Lyla Saolo Tapusoa	

== Men's tournaments ==
=== Seeds ===
1. (New Caledonia) Julien Delaplane (champion)
2. (Vanuatu) Cyril Jacobe (second place)
3. (Papua New Guinea) Matthew Dean Tui Stubbings (third place)
4. (Samoa) Leon Vainui Soonalole (quarterfinals)
5. (Fiji) Conway Jabez Kaitu'U Beg (semifinals)
6. (Tonga) Semisi Fanguna (second round)
7. (Fiji) William O'Connell (quarterfinals)
8. (Vanuatu) Aymeric Mara (quarterfinals)

=== Finals ===
Semifinals
1	(New Caledonia) Julien Delaplane	6	6
3	(Papua New Guinea) Matthew Dean Tui Stubbings	4	3
5	(Fiji) Conway Jabez Kaitu’U Beg	4	4
2	(Vanuatu) Cyril Jacobe	6	6

Final
1	(New Caledonia) Julien Delaplane	6	6
2	(Vanuatu) Cyril Jacobe	0	2

==== Top half ====
First round
(Samoa) Kristen Clement Pavitt	0	2
(Solomon Islands) Luke Paeni	6	6
(Fiji) Antonio O'Connell	6	6
(Tuvalu) Simon Tualigi	0	1
(Norfolk Island) Arki Nobbs	0	0
8	(Vanuatu) Aymeric Mara	6	6
(Kiribati) Tebatibunga Tito	3	2
(Tonga) Matavao Fanguna	6	6
(Vanuatu) Clément Mainguy	4	6	2
(Solomon Islands) Charlie Junior Benjamin	6	1	6
(Tuvalu) Manutapu Alefaio	0	0
7	(Fiji) William O'Connell	6	6

Second round
1	(New Caledonia) Julien Delaplane	6	6
(Solomon Islands) Luke Paeni	2	2
(Fiji) Antonio O'Connell	2	2
8	(Vanuatu) Aymeric Mara	6	6
3	(Papua New Guinea) Matthew Dean Tui Stubbings	6	6
(Tonga) Matavao Fanguna	1	0
(Solomon Islands) Charlie Junior Benjamin	5	6	2
7	(Fiji) William O'Connell	7	0	6

Quarterfinals
1	(New Caledonia) Julien Delaplane	6	6
8	(Vanuatu) Aymeric Mara	0	3
3	(Papua New Guinea) Matthew Dean Tui Stubbings	w
7	(Fiji) William O'Connell	o

Semifinals
1	(New Caledonia) Julien Delaplane	6	6
3	(Papua New Guinea) Matthew Dean Tui Stubbings	4	3

=== Bottom half ===
First round
5	(Fiji) Conway Jabez Kaitu’U Beg	6	6
(Tuvalu) Gavin Iakopo	1	0
(Kiribati) Tabera Bonteman	w
(Solomon Islands) Graham Mani	o
(Vanuatu) Lorenzo Pineda	7	1	5
(New Caledonia) Macéo Rouas	5	6	7
6	(Tonga) Semisi Fanguna	6	6
(Papua New Guinea) Eddie Israel Mera	0	2
(Fiji) Raynal Singh	6	6
(Tuvalu) Falealoto Sokomani	0	0
(New Caledonia) Victor Lopes	w
(Solomon Islands) Popai Leong	o

Second round
5	(Fiji) Conway Jabez Kaitu’U Beg	6	6
(Kiribati) Tabera Bonteman	1	1
(New Caledonia) Macéo Rouas	7^{7}	6^{6}	3
4	(Samoa) Leon Vainui Soonalole	6^{5}	7^{8}	6
6	(Tonga) Semisi Fanguna	6	2	6^{4}
(Fiji) Raynal Singh	1	6	7^{7}
(New Caledonia) Victor Lopes	2	0
2	(Vanuatu) Cyril Jacobe	6	6

Quarterfinals
5	(Fiji) Conway Jabez Kaitu’U Beg	6	3	6
4	(Samoa) Leon Vainui Soonalole	4	6	2
(Fiji) Raynal Singh	0	0
2	(Vanuatu) Cyril Jacobe	6	6

Semifinals
5	(Fiji) Conway Jabez Kaitu’U Beg	4	4
2	(Vanuatu) Cyril Jacobe	6	6

==== Play-off 3/4 ====
Final
3	(Papua New Guinea) Matthew Dean Tui Stubbings	6	6
5	(Fiji) Conway Jabez Kaitu’U Beg	0	3

=== Preliminary round ===
==== Group A ====
Team	Pld	W	L	GW	GL	Pts
Fiji	2	2	0	5	2	4
New Caledonia	2	1	1	4	2	3
Samoa	2	0	2	1	5	2

==== Fiji vs. Samoa ====
Fiji
2

4 December 2017, 09:00

Samoa
1

			1	2	3
1	(Fiji) (Samoa)	William O'Connell; Kristen Clement Pavitt	6; 0	6; 0
2	(Fiji) (Samoa)	Conway Jabez Kaitu’U Beg; Leon Vainui Soonalole	6; 2	3; 6	3; 6
3	(Fiji) (Samoa)	William O'Connell / Conway Jabez Kaitu’U Beg; Kristen Clement Pavitt / Leon Vainui Soonalole	6; 1	6; 1

==== New Caledonia vs. Fiji ====
New Caledonia
1

5 December 2017, 09:00

Fiji
2

			1	2	3
1	(New Caledonia) (Fiji)	Julien Delaplane; Conway Jabez Kaitu’U Beg	6; 4	6; 4
2	(New Caledonia) (Fiji)	Macéo Rouas; William O'Connell	1; 6	2; 6
3	(New Caledonia) (Fiji)	Julien Delaplane / Macéo Rouas; Conway Jabez Kaitu’U Beg / William O'Connell	4; 6	4; 6

==== New Caledonia vs. Samoa ====
New Caledonia
3

6 December 2017, 09:00

Samoa
0

			1	2	3
1	(New Caledonia) (Samoa)	Julien Delaplane; Leon Vainui Soonalole	6; 4	6; 1
2	(New Caledonia) (Samoa)	Macéo Rouas; Kristen Clement Pavitt	6; 0	6; 4
3	(New Caledonia) (Samoa)	Julien Delaplane / Macéo Rouas; Leon Vainui Soonalole / Kristen Clement Pavitt	6; 0	6; 2

==== Group B ====
Team	Pld	W	L	GW	GL	Pts
Vanuatu	2	2	0	6	0	4
Kiribati	2	1	1	3	3	3
Tuvalu	2	0	2	0	6	2

==== Vanuatu vs. Tuvalu ====
Vanuatu
3

4 December 2017, 09:00

Tuvalu
0

			1	2	3
1	(Vanuatu) (Tuvalu)	Aymeric Mara; Manutapu Alefaio	6; 0	6; 2
2	(Vanuatu) (Tuvalu)	Cyril Jacobe; Gavin Iakopo	6; 1	6; 0
3	(Vanuatu) (Tuvalu)	Clément Mainguy / Lorenzo Pineda; Falealoto Sokomani / Simon Tualigi	6; 0	6; 0

==== Tuvalu vs. Kiribati ====
Tuvalu
0

5 December 2017, 09:00

Kiribati
3

			1	2	3
1	(Tuvalu) (Kiribati)	Gavin Iakopo; Tabera Bonteman	3; 6	1; 6
2	(Tuvalu) (Kiribati)	Falealoto Sokomani; Tebatibunga Tito	0; 6	1; 6
3	(Tuvalu) (Kiribati)	Manutapu Alefaio / Simon Tualigi; Tabera Bonteman / Tebatibunga Tito	1; 6	1; 6

==== Vanuatu vs. Kiribati ====
Vanuatu
3

6 December 2017, 09:00

Kiribati
0

			1	2	3
1	(Vanuatu) (Kiribati)	Cyril Jacobe; Tabera Bonteman	6; 0	6; 0
2	(Vanuatu) (Kiribati)	Aymeric Mara; Tebatibunga Tito	6; 0	6; 2
3	(Vanuatu) (Kiribati)	Lorenzo Pineda / Leniker Thomas; Tabera Bonteman / Tebatibunga Tito	6; 2	6; 4

==== Group C ====
Team	Pld	W	L	GW	GL	Pts
Solomon Islands	2	2	0	4	1	4
Tonga	2	1	1	2	3	3
Papua New Guinea	2	0	2	2	4	2

==== Solomon Islands vs. Tonga ====
Solomon Islands
2

4 December 2017, 09:00

Tonga
0

			1	2	3
1	(Solomon Islands) (Tonga)	Luke Paeni; Matavao Fanguna	6; 4	6; 2
2	(Solomon Islands) (Tonga)	Charlie Junior Benjamin; Semisi Fanguna	6; 2	6; 3
3	(Solomon Islands) (Tonga)	Luke Paeni / Charlie Junior Benjamin; Matavao Fanguna / Semisi Fanguna				not played

==== Papua New Guinea vs. Solomon Islands ====
Papua New Guinea
1

5 December 2017, 09:00

Solomon Islands
2

			1	2	3
1	(Papua New Guinea) (Solomon Islands)	Matthew Dean Tui Stubbings; Charlie Junior Benjamin	6; 2	2; 0
2	(Papua New Guinea) (Solomon Islands)	Eddie Israel Mera; Luke Paeni	3; 6	3; 6
3	(Papua New Guinea) (Solomon Islands)	Matthew Dean Tui Stubbings / Eddie Israel Mera; Charlie Junior Benjamin / Luke Paeni	4; 6	6^{5} 7^{7}

==== Papua New Guinea vs. Tonga ====
Papua New Guinea
1

6 December 2017, 09:00

Tonga
2

			1	2	3
1	(Papua New Guinea) (Tonga)	Matthew Dean Tui Stubbings; Semisi Fanguna	6; 1	6; 2
2	(Papua New Guinea) (Tonga)	Eddie Israel Mera; Matavao Fanguna	0; 6	4; 6
3	(Papua New Guinea) (Tonga)	Matthew Dean Tui Stubbings / Eddie Israel Mera; Semisi Fanguna / Matavao Fanguna	2; 6	3; 6

=== Semi-finals ===
==== Vanuatu vs. Tonga ====
Vanuatu
2

7 December 2017, 09:00

Tonga
0

			1	2	3
1	(Vanuatu) (Tonga)	Aymeric Mara; Matavao Fanguna	6^{5} 7^{7}	7^{7} 6^{5}	6; 2
2	(Vanuatu) (Tonga)	Cyril Jacobe; Semisi Fanguna	7; 5	6; 1
3	(Vanuatu) (Tonga)	Cyril Jacobe / Aymeric Mara; Semisi Fanguna / Matavao Fanguna				not played

==== Fiji vs. New Caledonia ====
Fiji
2

7 December 2017, 09:00

New Caledonia
1

			1	2	3
1	(Fiji) (New Caledonia)	William O'Connell; Maceo Rouas	6; 3	6; 0
2	(Fiji) (New Caledonia)	Conway Jabez Kaitu'U Beg; Julien Delaplane	0; 6	6; 3	2; 6
3	(Fiji) (New Caledonia)	Conway Jabez Kaitu'U Beg / William O'Connell; Julien Delaplane / Maceo Rouas	6; 2	6; 3

=== Women's tournaments ===
==== Seeds ====
1. (Samoa) Steffi Carruthers (champion)
2. (Solomon Islands) Geojimah Sauramoniabu Row (second place)
3. (New Caledonia) Samuelle Bull (second round)
4. (Vanuatu) Marie Hyacinthe Liwuslili (semifinals)
5. (Tonga) Melenia Tupoutua Kaitaeifo (quarterfinals)
6. (Fiji) Ruby Coffin (second round, withdrew)
7. (Solomon Islands) Vinda Sylvia None Teally (quarterfinals)
8. (New Caledonia) Meryl Pydo (quarterfinals)

=== Finals ===
Semifinals
1	(Samoa) Steffi Carruthers	6	6
(Vanuatu) Rosalie Molbaleh	0	0
4	(Vanuatu) Marie Hyacinthe Liwuslili	3	1
2	(Solomon Islands) Geojimah Sauramoniabu Row	6	6

Final
1	(Samoa) Steffi Carruthers	6	6
2	(Solomon Islands) Geojimah Sauramoniabu Row	2	2

=== Top half ===
First round
(Norfolk Island) Courtney Grube	2	5
(Vanuatu) Desiree Signo	6	7

Second round
1	(Samoa) Steffi Carruthers	6	6
(Vanuatu) Desiree Signo	0	1
(Fiji) Vienna Kumar	6	6^{3}	1
7	(Solomon Islands) Vinda Sylvia None Teally	3	7^{7}	6
3	(New Caledonia) Samuelle Bull	6	2	1
(Vanuatu) Rosalie Molbaleh	4	6	6
(Samoa) Lyla Saolo Tapusoa	3	0
5	(Tonga) Melenia Tupoutua Kaitaeifo	6	6

Quarterfinals
1	(Samoa) Steffi Carruthers	6	6
7	(Solomon Islands) Vinda Sylvia None Teally	3	0
(Vanuatu) Rosalie Molbaleh	6	3	6
5	(Tonga) Melenia Tupoutua Kaitaeifo	3	6	4

Semifinals
1	(Samoa) Steffi Carruthers	6	6
(Vanuatu) Rosalie Molbaleh	0	0

=== Bottom half ===
First round
(Fiji) Maainaima Tausii	2	1
(Vanuatu) Daisy Sipiti	6	6

Second round
8	(New Caledonia) Meryl Pydo	6	6
(Solomon Islands) Dorrine Numa Ningalo	3	4
(Samoa) Crystal Angela Christman	2	3
4	(Vanuatu) Marie Hyacinthe Liwuslili	6	6
6	(Fiji) Ruby Coffin	o
(Tonga) Brookie Maasi	w
(Vanuatu) Daisi Sipiti	0	0
2	(Solomon Islands) Geojimah Sauramoniabu Row	6	6

Quarterfinals
8	(New Caledonia) Meryl Pydo	3	4
4	(Vanuatu) Marie Hyacinthe Liwuslili	6	6
(Tonga) Brookie Maasi	2	1
2	(Solomon Islands) Geojimah Sauramoniabu Row	6	6

Semifinals
4	(Vanuatu) Marie Hyacinthe Liwuslili	3	1
2	(Solomon Islands) Geojimah Sauramoniabu Row	6	6

==== Play-off 3/4 ====
Finals
	(Vanuatu) Rosalie Molbaleh	6	6
4	(Vanuatu) Marie Hyacinthe Liwuslili	0	3

=== Preliminary round ===
==== Group A ====
Team	Pld	W	L	GW	GL	Pts
Solomon Islands	2	2	0	6	0	6
New Caledonia	2	1	1	3	3	3
Fiji	2	0	2	0	6	0

==== Solomon Islands vs. Fiji ====
Fiji
0

4 December 2017, 09:00

Solomon Islands
3

			1	2	3
1	(Fiji) (Solomon Islands)	Vienna Kumar; Vinda Teally	3; 6	3; 6
2	(Fiji) (Solomon Islands)	Ruby Coffin; Geojimah Sauramoniabu Row	1; 6	2; 6
3	(Fiji) (Solomon Islands)	Ruby Coffin / Vienna Kumar; Geojimah Sauramoniabu Row / Vinda Teally	0; 6	4; 6

==== New Caledonia vs. Fiji ====
New Caledonia
3

5 December 2017, 09:00

Fiji
0

			1	2	3
1	(New Caledonia) (Fiji)	Samuelle Bull; Ruby Coffin	7^{7} 6^{4}	6; 0
2	(New Caledonia) (Fiji)	Meryl Pydo; Vienna Kumar	6; 2	6; 4
3	(New Caledonia) (Fiji)	Samuelle Bull / Meryl Pydo; Ruby Coffin / Vienna Kumar	6; 2	6; 4

==== New Caledonia vs. Solomon Islands ====
New Caledonia
0

6 December 2017, 09:00

Solomon Islands
3

			1	2	3
1	(New Caledonia) (Solomon Islands)	Samuelle Bull; Geojimah Sauramoniabu Row	7^{11} 6^{9}	1; 6	6^{4} 7^{7}
2	(New Caledonia) (Solomon Islands)	Meryl Pydo; Vinda Teally	2; 6	4; 6
3	(New Caledonia) (Solomon Islands)	Samuelle Bull / Meryl Pydo; Geojimah Sauramoniabu Row / Vinda Teally	0; 6	0; 6

==== Group B ====
Team	Pld	W	L	GW	GL	Pts
Samoa	2	2	0	4	2	4
Vanuatu	2	1	1	3	3	3
Tonga	2	0	2	2	4	2

==== Vanuatu vs. Tonga ====
Vanuatu
2

4 December 2017, 09:00

Tonga
1

			1	2	3
1	(Vanuatu) (Tonga)	Rosalie Molbaleh; Brookie Maasi	5; 7	7^{7} 6^{4}	7^{7} 6^{5}
2	(Vanuatu) (Tonga)	Marie Liwuslili; Melania Kaitaeifo	4; 6	6; 0	7^{7} 6^{2}
3	(Vanuatu) (Tonga)	Rosalie Molbaleh / Daisy Sipirit; Melania Kaitaeifo / Brookie Maasi	4; 6	2; 6

==== Samoa vs. Vanuatu ====
Samoa
2

5 December 2017, 09:00

Vanuatu
1

			1	2	3
1	(Samoa) (Vanuatu)	Steffi Carruthers; Marie Liwuslili	6; 2	6; 0
2	(Samoa) (Vanuatu)	Lyla Tapusoa; Rosalie Molbaleh	2; 6	2; 6
3	(Samoa) (Vanuatu)	Steffi Carruthers / Lyla Tapusoa; Marie Liwuslili / Rosalie Molbaleh	6; 3	6; 0

==== Samoa vs. Tonga ====
Samoa
2

6 December 2017, 09:00

Tonga
1

			1	2	3
1	(Samoa) (Tonga)	Steffi Carruthers; Melania Kaitaeifo	6; 0	6; 0
2	(Samoa) (Tonga)	Lyla Tapusoa; Brookie Maasi	3; 6	2; 6
3	(Samoa) (Tonga)	Steffi Carruthers / Lyla Tapusoa; Melania Kaitaeifo / Brookie Maasi	6; 3	6; 2

=== Third Place ===
==== Solomon Islands vs. Vanuatu ====
Solomon Islands
2

7 December 2017, 09:00

Vanuatu
0

			1	2	3
1	(Solomon Islands) (Vanuatu)	Vinda Teally; Rosalie Molbaleh	6; 4	6; 4
2	(Solomon Islands) (Vanuatu)	Geojimah Sauramoniabu Row; Marie Liwuslili	6; 2	6; 1
3	(Solomon Islands) (Vanuatu)	Geojimah Sauramoniabu Row / Vinda Teally; Marie Liwuslili / Rosalie Molbaleh				not played

=== Final ===
==== Samoa vs. New Caledonia ====
Samoa
1

7 December 2017, 09:00

New Caledonia
2

			1	2	3
1	(Samoa) (New Caledonia)	Lyla Saolo Tapusoa; Meryl Pydo	0; 6	0; 6
2	(Samoa) (New Caledonia)	Steffi Carruthers; Samuelle Bull	6; 3	6; 4
3	(Samoa) (New Caledonia)	Steffi Carruthers / Lyla Saolo Tapusoa; Samuelle Bull / Meryl Pydo	4; 6	6^{5} 7^{7}

== See also ==
- Tennis at the Pacific Games
