= Muhammad Rifqi Fitriadi =

Indonesian tennis player (born 1999)

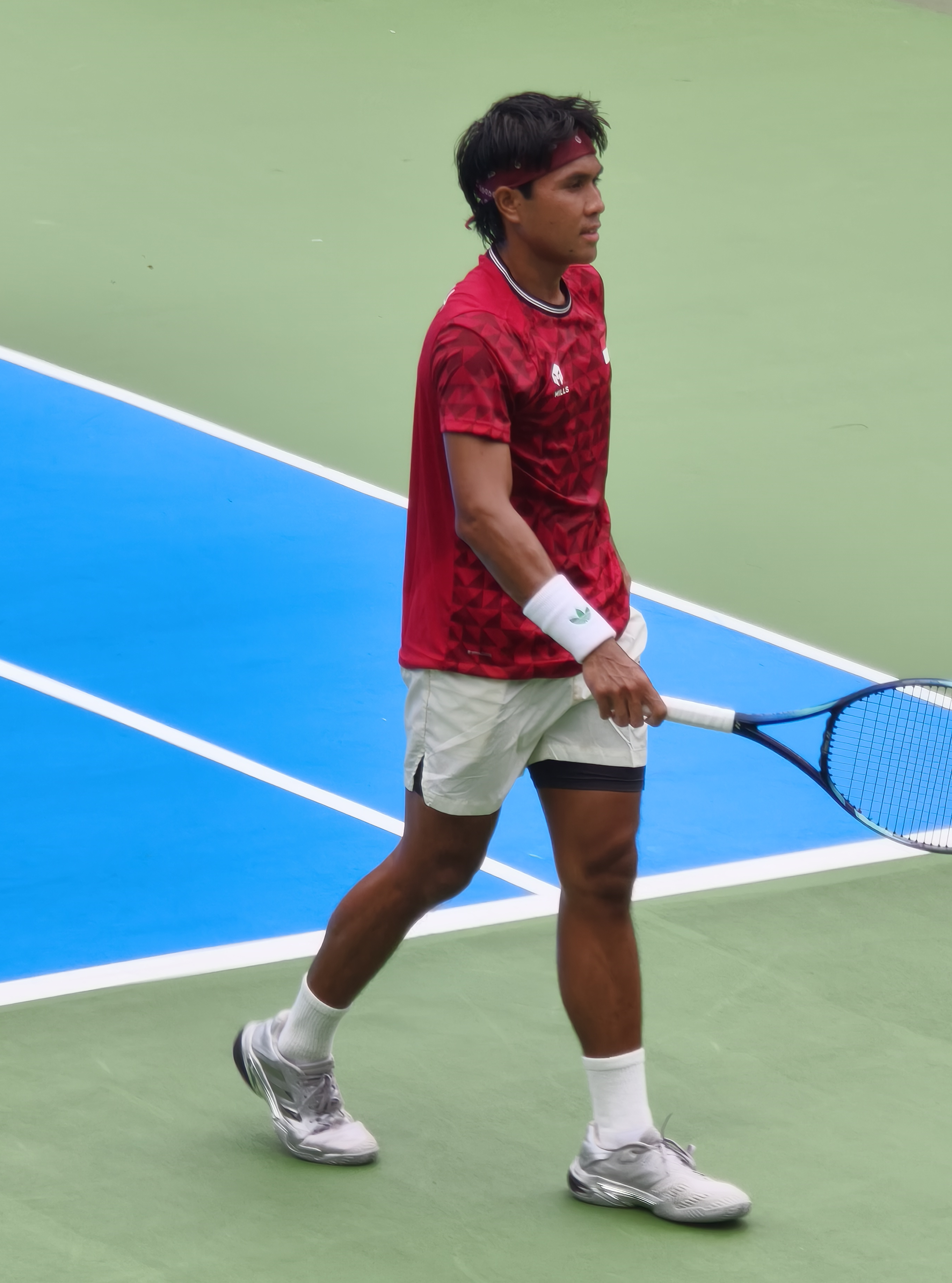
- Fitriadi in 2026
- Country (sports): Indonesia
- Residence: Jakarta, Indonesia
- Born: 23 January 1999 (age 27) Banjarmasin, Indonesia
- Height: 1.75 m (5 ft 9 in)
- Plays: Right-handed (one-handed backhand)
- Coach: Hary Suharyadi
- Prize money: US $53,039

Singles
- Career record: 4–4 (at ATP Tour level, Grand Slam level, and in Davis Cup)
- Career titles: 0
- Highest ranking: No. 510 (31 August 2026)
- Current ranking: No. 524 (9 November 2026)

Doubles
- Career record: 2–2 (at ATP Tour level, Grand Slam level, and in Davis Cup)
- Career titles: 0
- Highest ranking: No. 506 (31 August 2026)
- Current ranking: No. 604 (9 November 2026)

Team competitions
- Davis Cup: 4–3
Medal record
Men's Tennis
Representing Indonesia
Asian Indoor and Martial Arts Games
Bronze medal – third place	2017 Ashgabat	Mixed doubles
SEA Games
Gold medal – first place	2023 Cambodia	Singles
Gold medal – first place	2025 Thailand	Team
Silver medal – second place	2021 Vietnam	Team
Bronze medal – third place	2023 Cambodia	Team
Bronze medal – third place	2025 Thailand	Doubles
ASEAN School Games
Silver medal – second place	2017 Singapore	Team
Bronze medal – third place	2017 Singapore	Mixed doubles
- Last updated on: 9 November 2026.

Muhammad Rifqi Fitriadi (born 23 January 1999) is an Indonesian tennis player. He has a career high ATP singles ranking of No. 510 and a career high ATP doubles ranking of No. 506, both achieved on 31 August 2026.

Rifqi has represented Indonesia at the Davis Cup, where he has a win–loss record of 4–3.

== ATP Challenger and ITF World Tennis Tour finals ==
=== Singles: 4 (3 titles, 1 runner-up) ===
Legend ATP Challenger Tour (0–0) ITF World Tennis Tour (2–1)	Finals by surface Hard (2–1) Clay (0–0) Grass (0–0) Carpet (0–0)

Result	W–L	Date	Tournament	Tier	Surface	Opponent	Score
Loss	0–1	Mar 2023	M25 Jakarta, Indonesia	World Tennis Tour	Hard	(Australia) Dayne Kelly	0–6, 0–6
Win	1–1	Jul 2023	M15 Jakarta, Indonesia	World Tennis Tour	Hard	(Thailand) Palaphoom Kovapitukted	6–3, 6–4
Win	2–1	Jul 2026	M15 Wuning, China	World Tennis Tour	Hard	Amirkhamza Nasridinov	6–3, 6–3
Win	3–1	Jul 2026	M15 Wuning, China	World Tennis Tour	Hard	(South Korea) Roh Ho-young	6–4, 6–3
Win	4–1	Aug 2026	M15 Maanshan, China	World Tennis Tour	Hard	(Japan) Kokoro Isomura	7–5, 6–3

=== Doubles: 7 (6 titles, 1 runner-up) ===
Legend ATP Challenger Tour (0–0) ITF World Tennis Tour (5–1)	Finals by surface Hard (5–1) Clay (0–0) Grass (0–0) Carpet (0–0)

Result	W–L	Date	Tournament	Tier	Surface	Partner	Opponent	Score
Win	1–0	Mar 2025	M15 Nonthaburi, Thailand	World Tennis Tour	Hard	(Indonesia) Christopher Rungkat	(Thailand) Thanapet Chanta (Thailand) Yuttana Charoenphon	6–2, 6–4
Win	2–0	Sep 2025	M25 Bali, Indonesia	World Tennis Tour	Hard	(Indonesia) Christopher Rungkat	(Malaysia) Mitsuki Wei Kang Leong (Japan) Koki Matsuda	6–0, 2–6, [10–7]
Win	3–0	Nov 2025	M15 Kuala Lumpur, Malaysia	World Tennis Tour	Hard	(Indonesia) Christopher Rungkat	(Philippines) Francis Alcantara (Australia) Chase Ferguson	4–6, 6–3, [12–10]
Win	4–0	Nov 2025	M15 Phan Thiet, Vietnam	World Tennis Tour	Hard	(Indonesia) Christopher Rungkat	(Thailand) Thanapet Chanta (Thailand) Pawit Sornlaksup	6–4, 6–3
Loss	4–1	Jul 2026	M15 Wuning, China	World Tennis Tour	Hard	(South Korea) Lee Duck-hee	(China) Yang Zijiang (China) Zeng Yaojie	4–6, 6–7^{(5–7)}
Win	5–1	Jul 2026	M15 Wuning, China	World Tennis Tour	Hard	(Armenia) Daniil Sarksian	(Chinese Taipei) Chin Kuan-lai (Chinese Taipei) Hsieh Cheng-peng	6–7^{(3–7)}, 7–6^{(7–5)}, [12–10]

== ITF Junior Circuit finals ==
=== Doubles: 1 (1 title) ===
Legend Category GA Category G1 Category G2 Category G3 Category G4 Category G5	Finals by surface Hard (1–0) Clay (0–0) Grass (0–0) Carpet (0–0)

Result	W–L	Date	Tournament	Tier	Surface	Partner	Opponents	Score
Win	1–0	Oct 2015	ITF Jakarta, Indonesia	G4	Hard	(Indonesia) Iswandaru Kusumo Putro	(Indonesia) Muhammad Althaf Dhaifullah (Indonesia) Rindosa Wijaya	5–7, 7–6^{(7–5)}, [10–5]

== National representation ==
=== Multi-sport event (Individual) ===
Rifqi made his debut in multi-sport event at the 2017 Asian Indoor and Martial Arts Games, he won mixed doubles bronze medal.

==== Singles: 1 (1 gold medal) ====
Result	Date	Tournament	Surface	Opponent	Score	Ref
Gold	May 2023	SEA Games, Phnom Penh	Hard	(Vietnam) Lý Hoàng Nam	6–4, 6–1	

==== Mixed doubles: 1 (1 bronze medal) ====
Result	Date	Tournament	Surface	Partner	Opponents	Score
Bronze	Sep 2017	Asian Indoor and Martial Arts Games, Ashgabat	Hard	(Indonesia) Deria Nur Haliza	(Thailand) Nuttanon Kadchapanan (Thailand) Nicha Lertpitaksinchai	3–6, 1–6

== See also ==
- List of Indonesia Davis Cup team representatives
