= Tennis at the 2017 Asian Indoor and Martial Arts Games =

- Venue: Ashgabat Indoor Tennis Arena
- Dates: 17–27 September 2017

Tennis was contested at the 2017 Asian Indoor and Martial Arts Games from 17 to 27 September 2017. The competition took place at the Indoor Tennis Arena in Ashgabat, Turkmenistan.

== Medalists ==
Event	Gold	Silver	Bronze
Men's singles	Sumit Nagal; India	Vijay Sundar Prashanth; India	Sanjar Fayziev; Uzbekistan
Men's singles	Sumit Nagal; India	Vijay Sundar Prashanth; India	Farrukh Dustov; Uzbekistan
Men's doubles	India; Vijay Sundar Prashanth; Vishnu Vardhan	Kazakhstan; Timur Khabibulin; Denis Yevseyev	Hong Kong; Wong Chun Hun; Wong Hong Kit
Men's doubles	India; Vijay Sundar Prashanth; Vishnu Vardhan	Kazakhstan; Timur Khabibulin; Denis Yevseyev	Thailand; Nuttanon Kadchapanan; Patcharapol Kawin
Women's singles	Beatrice Gumulya; Indonesia	Aldila Sutjiadi; Indonesia	Chompoothip Jundakate; Thailand
Women's singles	Beatrice Gumulya; Indonesia	Aldila Sutjiadi; Indonesia	Patcharin Cheapchandej; Thailand
Women's doubles	Thailand; Tamachan Momkoonthod; Varunya Wongteanchai	India; Ankita Raina; Prarthana Thombare	Indonesia; Jessy Rompies; Lavinia Tananta
Women's doubles	Thailand; Tamachan Momkoonthod; Varunya Wongteanchai	India; Ankita Raina; Prarthana Thombare	Chinese Taipei; Chang Hsiao-yun; Wei Ting-chieh
Mixed doubles	Thailand; Nuttanon Kadchapanan; Nicha Lertpitaksinchai	India; Vishnu Vardhan; Prarthana Thombare	Uzbekistan; Sanjar Fayziev; Arina Folts
Mixed doubles	Thailand; Nuttanon Kadchapanan; Nicha Lertpitaksinchai	India; Vishnu Vardhan; Prarthana Thombare	Indonesia; Muhammad Rifqi Fitriadi; Deria Nur Haliza

== Medal table ==
Rank	Nation	Gold	Silver	Bronze	Total
1	India (IND)	2	3	0	5
2	Thailand (THA)	2	0	3	5
3	Indonesia (INA)	1	1	2	4
4	Kazakhstan (KAZ)	0	1	0	1
5	Uzbekistan (UZB)	0	0	3	3
6	Chinese Taipei (TPE)	0	0	1	1
6	Hong Kong (HKG)	0	0	1	1
Totals (7 entries)		5	5	10	20

== Results ==
=== Men's singles ===
First round – 17–19 September
Sanjar Fayziev (UZB)	2–0 (6–2, 6–1)	Congsup Congcar (THA)
Amir Vala Madanchi (IRI)	2–1 (6–2, 5–7, 6–2)	Cyril Jacobe (VAN)
Tebatibunga Bira (KIR)	0–2 (2–6, 0–6)	Isa Mämmetgulyýew (TKM)
Anthony Susanto (INA)	0–2 (3–6, 4–6)	Wong Hong Kit (HKG)
Vijay Sundar Prashanth (IND)	2–0 (6–1, 6–4)	Heera Ashiq (PAK)
Manutapu Alefaio (TUV)	0–2 (0–6, 0–6)	Lo Yi-jui (TPE)
Michel Saade (LBN)	2–0 (6–2, 6–1)	Raynal Singh (FIJ)
Said Sharifi (AFG)	0–2 (1–6, 1–6)	Timur Khabibulin (KAZ)
David Agung Susanto (INA)	2–0 (7–5, 6–2)	Ýuriý Rogusskiý (TKM)
Farrukh Dustov (UZB)	2–0 (7–5, 6–2)	Jeson Patrombon (PHI)
Hamid Reza Naddaf (IRI)	2–0 (6–0, 6–0)	Bauro Lambourne (KIR)
Tamim Hallak (LBN)	0–2 (3–6, 1–6)	Denis Yevseyev (KAZ)
Wong Chun Hun (HKG)	2–0 (6–3, 6–3)	Wang Cheng-chieh (TPE)
Ahmed Choudhary (PAK)	2–0 (6–0, 6–0)	Gavin Iakopo (TUV)
Palaphoom Kovapitukted (THA)	2–0 (6–3, 6–3)	Conway Beg (FIJ)
Leniker Thomas (VAN)	0–2 (0–6, 1–6)	Sumit Nagal (IND)

Second round 20–21 September
Sanjar Fayziev (UZB)	6	6
Amir Vala Madanchi (IRI)	2	0
Isa Mämmetgulyýew (TKM)	7	4	6^{1}
Wong Hong Kit (HKG)	5	6	7^{7}
Vijay Sundar Prashanth (IND)	6	6
Lo Yi-jui (TPE)	1	2
Michel Saade (LBN)	6^{2}	3
Timur Khabibulin (KAZ)	7^{7}	6
David Agung Susanto (INA)	4	4
Farrukh Dustov (UZB)	6	6
Hamid Reza Naddaf (IRI)	4	3
Denis Yevseyev (KAZ)	6	6
Wong Chun Hun (HKG)	6	6
Ahmed Choudhary (PAK)	1	4
Palaphoom Kovapitukted (THA)	0	1
Sumit Nagal (IND)	6	6

Quarterfinals; 22–23 September
Sanjar Fayziev (UZB)	6^{3}	6	6
Wong Hong Kit (HKG)	7^{7}	4	4
Vijay Sundar Prashanth (IND)	4	6	7^{7}
Timur Khabibulin (KAZ)	6	3	6^{3}
Farrukh Dustov (UZB)	6	6
Denis Yevseyev (KAZ)	2	3
Wong Chun Hun (HKG)	6^{4}	6^{4}
Sumit Nagal (IND)	7^{7}	7^{7}

Semifinals; 24–25 September
Sanjar Fayziev (UZB)	4	2
Vijay Sundar Prashanth (IND)	6	6
Farrukh Dustov (UZB)	4	5
Sumit Nagal (IND)	6	7

Final; 27 September
Vijay Sundar Prashanth (IND)	1	1
Sumit Nagal (IND)	6	6

=== Men's doubles ===
First round 20–22 September
Chuang Hsiang-yu (TPE); Su Yu-hsiang (TPE)	6	6
Tamim Hallak (LBN); Michel Saade (LBN)	3	4
Wong Chun Hun (HKG); Wong Hong Kit (HKG)	6	6
Manutapu Alefaio (TUV); Gavin Iakopo (TUV)	0	0
Aditya Hari Sasongko (INA); Sunu Wahyu Trijati (INA)	6	6
Amir Vala Madanchi (IRI); Hamid Reza Naddaf (IRI)	2	2
Conway Beg (FIJ); Antonio O'Connell (FIJ)	0	2
Nuttanon Kadchapanan (THA); Patcharapol Kawin (THA)	6	6
Ahmed Choudhary (PAK); Abdaal Haider (PAK)	1	1
Farrukh Dustov (UZB); Sanjar Fayziev (UZB)	6	6
Tebatibunga Bira (KIR); Bauro Lambourne (KIR)	1	1
Cyril Jacobe (VAN); Clement Mainguy (VAN)	6	6
Isa Mämmetgulyýew (TKM); Ýuriý Rogusskiý (TKM)	4	6^{3}
Timur Khabibulin (KAZ); Denis Yevseyev (KAZ)	6	7^{7}

Quarterfinals; 24 September
Vijay Sundar Prashanth (IND); Vishnu Vardhan (IND)	6	6
Chuang Hsiang-yu (TPE); Su Yu-hsiang (TPE)	2	0
Wong Chun Hun (HKG); Wong Hong Kit (HKG)	6	6
Aditya Hari Sasongko (INA); Sunu Wahyu Trijati (INA)	4	2
Nuttanon Kadchapanan (THA); Patcharapol Kawin (THA)	6	6
Farrukh Dustov (UZB); Sanjar Fayziev (UZB)	3	4
Cyril Jacobe (VAN); Clement Mainguy (VAN)	2	2
Timur Khabibulin (KAZ); Denis Yevseyev (KAZ)	6	6

Semifinals; 25 September
Vijay Sundar Prashanth (IND); Vishnu Vardhan (IND)	6	3	6
Wong Chun Hun (HKG); Wong Hong Kit (HKG)	4	6	1
Nuttanon Kadchapanan (THA); Patcharapol Kawin (THA)	3	6	5
Timur Khabibulin (KAZ); Denis Yevseyev (KAZ)	6	2	7

Final; 26 September
Vijay Sundar Prashanth (IND); Vishnu Vardhan (IND)	6	6
Timur Khabibulin (KAZ); Denis Yevseyev (KAZ)	3	4

=== Women's singles ===
First round – 17–19 September
Ankita Raina (IND)	2–1 (7–5, 4–6, 6–2)	Katherine Ip (HKG)
Ushna Suhail (PAK)	1–2 (7–6^{(10–8)}, 2–6, 0–6)	Wang Chao-yi (TPE)
Jahan Baýramowa (TKM)	2–1 (3–6, 7–6^{(7–5)}, 7–5)	Mahta Khanloo (IRI)
Yara Fayssal (LBN)	0–2 (0–6, 0–6)	Beatrice Gumulya (INA)
Fatma Al-Nabhani (OMA)	0–2 (3–6, 2–6)	Chompoothip Jundakate (THA)
Vienna Kumar (FIJ)	0–2 (0–6, 1–6)	Khim Iglupas (PHI)
Kaoa Fakaofo (KIR)	0–2 (0–6, 0–6)	Yuliya Kim (UZB)
Marie Liwuslili (VAN)	0–2 (1–6, 0–6)	Alexandra Grinchishina (KAZ)
Patcharin Cheapchandej (THA)	2–0 (6–3, 6–0)	Shahrzad Bani (IRI)
Hoda Habib (LBN)	0–2 (4–6, 4–6)	Wei Ling-hsuan (TPE)
Sarah Mahboob Khan (PAK)	1–2 (6–4, 2–6, 1–6)	Steffi Carruthers (SAM)
Rosalie Molbaleh (VAN)	0–2 (0–6, 0–6)	Riya Bhatia (IND)
Arina Folts (UZB)	0–2 (3–6, 2–6)	Aldila Sutjiadi (INA)
Saintly Molotii (TUV)	0–2 (1–6, 0–6)	Anna Clarice Patrimonio (PHI)
Ruby Coffin (FIJ)	2–0 (7–6^{(7–4)}, 7–6^{(7–2)})	Maryam Al-Balushi (OMA)
Anastasiýa Prenko (TKM)	0–2 (2–6, 0–6)	Kamila Kerimbayeva (KAZ)

Second round 20–21 September
Ankita Raina (IND)	6	6
Wang Chao-yi (TPE)	0	1
Jahan Baýramowa (TKM)	2	0
Beatrice Gumulya (INA)	6	6
Chompoothip Jundakate (THA)	6	7
Khim Iglupas (PHI)	3	5
Yuliya Kim (UZB)	6	3	2
Alexandra Grinchishina (KAZ)	0	6	6
Patcharin Cheapchandej (THA)	6	6
Wei Ling-hsuan (TPE)	0	0
Steffi Carruthers (SAM)	4	2
Riya Bhatia (IND)	6	6
Aldila Sutjiadi (INA)	6	6
Anna Clarice Patrimonio (PHI)	1	0
Ruby Coffin (FIJ)	0	1
Kamila Kerimbayeva (KAZ)	6	6

Quarterfinals; 21–22 September
Ankita Raina (IND)	3	4
Beatrice Gumulya (INA)	6	6
Chompoothip Jundakate (THA)	6	6
Alexandra Grinchishina (KAZ)	2	3
Patcharin Cheapchandej (THA)	6	6
Riya Bhatia (IND)	4	4
Aldila Sutjiadi (INA)	W	O
Kamila Kerimbayeva (KAZ)	W	O

Semifinals; 24 September
Beatrice Gumulya (INA)	2	6	7
Chompoothip Jundakate (THA)	6	3	5
Patcharin Cheapchandej (THA)	6^{8}	3
Aldila Sutjiadi (INA)	7^{10}	6

Final; 26 September
Beatrice Gumulya (INA)	6	3	6
Aldila Sutjiadi (INA)	3	6	3

=== Women's doubles ===
First round 21 September
Khim Iglupas (PHI); Anna Clarice Patrimonio (PHI)	6	6
Yasmina Karimjanova (UZB); Yuliya Kim (UZB)	4	3
Alexandra Grinchishina (KAZ); Kamila Kerimbayeva (KAZ)
Ruby Coffin (FIJ); Vienna Kumar (FIJ)	W	O
Jessy Rompies (INA); Lavinia Tananta (INA)	6	6
Fatma Al-Nabhani (OMA); Sarah Al-Balushi (OMA)	2	2
Chang Hsiao-yun (TPE); Wei Ting-chieh (TPE)	6	6
Sara Mansoor (PAK); Sarah Mahboob Khan (PAK)	2	0
Marie Liwuslili (VAN); Daisy Sipiti (VAN)	0	0
Jahan Baýramowa (TKM); Anastasiýa Prenko (TKM)	6	6
Shahrzad Bani (IRI); Mahta Khanloo (IRI)	5	2
Yara Fayssal (LBN); Hoda Habib (LBN)	7	6

Quarterfinals; 23 September
Ankita Raina (IND); Prarthana Thombare (IND)	6	6
Khim Iglupas (PHI); Anna Clarice Patrimonio (PHI)	3	3
Ruby Coffin (FIJ); Vienna Kumar (FIJ)	0	0
Jessy Rompies (INA); Lavinia Tananta (INA)	6	6
Chang Hsiao-yun (TPE); Wei Ting-chieh (TPE)	7^{8}	6
Jahan Baýramowa (TKM); Anastasiýa Prenko (TKM)	6^{6}	3
Yara Fayssal (LBN); Hoda Habib (LBN)	0	1
Tamachan Momkoonthod (THA); Varunya Wongteanchai (THA)	6	6

Semifinals; 25 September
Ankita Raina (IND); Prarthana Thombare (IND)	3	7^{8}	6
Jessy Rompies (INA); Lavinia Tananta (INA)	6	6^{6}	4
Chang Hsiao-yun (TPE); Wei Ting-chieh (TPE)	0	3
Tamachan Momkoonthod (THA); Varunya Wongteanchai (THA)	6	6

Final; 26 September
Ankita Raina (IND); Prarthana Thombare (IND)	6	3	6^{5}
Tamachan Momkoonthod (THA); Varunya Wongteanchai (THA)	3	6	7^{7}

=== Mixed doubles ===
First round 20 September
Tebatibunga Bira (KIR); Kaoa Fakaofo (KIR)	2	2
Jeson Patrombon (PHI); Khim Iglupas (PHI)	6	6
Sanjar Fayziev (UZB); Arina Folts (UZB)	6	6
Raynal Singh (FIJ); Vienna Kumar (FIJ)	1	1
Wong Hong Kit (HKG); Katherine Ip (HKG)	6	6
Leniker Thomas (VAN); Rosalie Molbaleh (VAN)	1	0
Gavin Iakopo (TUV); Saintly Molotii (TUV)	0	1
Isa Mämmetgulyýew (TKM); Anastasiýa Prenko (TKM)	6	6
Wang Cheng-chieh (TPE); Chang Hsiao-yun (TPE)	1	1
Nuttanon Kadchapanan (THA); Nicha Lertpitaksinchai (THA)	6	6
Muhammad Rifqi Fitriadi (INA); Deria Nur Haliza (INA)	7	6
Heera Ashiq (PAK); Ushna Suhail (PAK)	5	4

Quarterfinals; 21–22 September
Vishnu Vardhan (IND); Prarthana Thombare (IND)	6	3	7
Jeson Patrombon (PHI); Khim Iglupas (PHI)	4	6	5
Sanjar Fayziev (UZB); Arina Folts (UZB)	6	6
Wong Hong Kit (HKG); Katherine Ip (HKG)	3	4
Isa Mämmetgulyýew (TKM); Anastasiýa Prenko (TKM)	6^{3}	4
Nuttanon Kadchapanan (THA); Nicha Lertpitaksinchai (THA)	7^{7}	6
Muhammad Rifqi Fitriadi (INA); Deria Nur Haliza (INA)	W	O
Timur Khabibulin (KAZ); Kamila Kerimbayeva (KAZ)

Semifinals; 23 September
Vishnu Vardhan (IND); Prarthana Thombare (IND)	7^{7}	7^{8}
Sanjar Fayziev (UZB); Arina Folts (UZB)	6^{4}	6^{6}
Nuttanon Kadchapanan (THA); Nicha Lertpitaksinchai (THA)	6	6
Muhammad Rifqi Fitriadi (INA); Deria Nur Haliza (INA)	3	1

Final; 25 September
Vishnu Vardhan (IND); Prarthana Thombare (IND)	7	4	2
Nuttanon Kadchapanan (THA); Nicha Lertpitaksinchai (THA)	5	6	6
