= Karan Hegiste =

Indian Sprinter (born 2002)

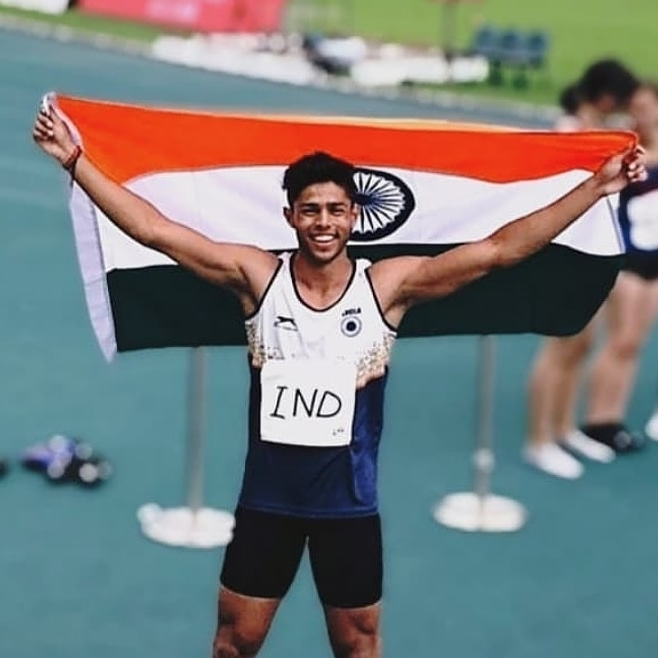

Personal information
- Full name: Karan Vivek Hegiste
- Nationality: Indian
- Born: 23 March 2002 (age 24) Mumbai
- Height: 174 cm (5 ft 9 in)
- Weight: 75 kg (165 lb)

Sport
- Sport: Track and field
- Events: 100m, 200m
- Team: India

Achievements and titles
- Personal bests: 100m 10.70 sec (Nashik 2018) 200m-21.98 sec
Medal record
Men's athletics
Representing India
Asian youth Games

Karan Hegiste (born 23 March 2002) is an Indian sprinter. He was a gold medallist at the 3rd Asian Youth Games. He also represented Team India in the 100m race in that event. Hegiste has been a national medallist in several 100m and 200m events, including the 1st Khelo India School Games and 33rd National Junior Championship.

== Career ==
In March 2019, Hegiste ran the first leg (100m) in a medley relay where Team India won the gold medal. He trains in Mumbai under Sandarsh Shetty and hold many championship records including the Maharashtra State 100m record with the performance of 10.70 sec. Hegiste has claimed several national medals including the 1st Khelo India School Games and several national championships.
