= Kickboxing at the 2013 Asian Indoor and Martial Arts Games =

- Venue: Dowon Gymnasium
- Dates: 3–6 July 2013

Kickboxing for the 2013 Asian Indoor and Martial Arts Games was held at the Dowon Gymnasium, Incheon, South Korea. It took place from 3 to 6 July 2013. Previously, in 2009, this sport was contested at both Hanoi (Asian Indoor Games) and Bangkok (Asian Martial Arts Games) separately.

== Medalists ==
=== Point fighting ===
Event	Gold	Silver	Bronze
Men's −63 kg	Haidar Mohammed; Iraq	Azamat Abdiraimov; Uzbekistan	Bilal Al-Hashash; Jordan
Men's −63 kg	Haidar Mohammed; Iraq	Azamat Abdiraimov; Uzbekistan	Kim Jun-seong; South Korea
Men's −74 kg	Nguyễn Văn Sử; Vietnam	Husain Al-Banay; Kuwait	Kakim Kairat; Kazakhstan
Men's −74 kg	Nguyễn Văn Sử; Vietnam	Husain Al-Banay; Kuwait	Ahmed Karim; Iraq
Women's −55 kg	Park Hye-young; South Korea	Farah Hattab; Jordan	Ganjina Khabibullaeva; Tajikistan
Women's −55 kg	Park Hye-young; South Korea	Farah Hattab; Jordan	Đào Thị Thoan; Vietnam

=== Full contact ===
Event	Gold	Silver	Bronze
Men's −57 kg	Gurban Beghanow; Turkmenistan	Ahmad Al-Jarajreh; Jordan	Namjilmaagiin Bat-Erdene; Mongolia
Men's −57 kg	Gurban Beghanow; Turkmenistan	Ahmad Al-Jarajreh; Jordan	Ulanbek Kasymbekov; Kyrgyzstan
Men's −71 kg	Sayan Zhakupov; Kazakhstan	Stalbek Darkanbaev; Kyrgyzstan	Jehad Adwan; Palestine
Men's −71 kg	Sayan Zhakupov; Kazakhstan	Stalbek Darkanbaev; Kyrgyzstan	Trần Thành Ý Vietnam
Women's −56 kg	Nguyễn Thị Tuyết Mai; Vietnam	Tamara Temirbayeva; Kazakhstan	Baraah Al-Absi; Jordan
Women's −56 kg	Nguyễn Thị Tuyết Mai; Vietnam	Tamara Temirbayeva; Kazakhstan	Shakhnoza Khujaniyozova; Uzbekistan

=== Low kick ===
Event	Gold	Silver	Bronze
Men's −63.5 kg	Aleksey Fedoseev; Kyrgyzstan	Yu Hyun-woo; South Korea	Aday Abuhasoah; Jordan
Men's −63.5 kg	Aleksey Fedoseev; Kyrgyzstan	Yu Hyun-woo; South Korea	Şöhrat Hallyýew; Turkmenistan
Men's −81 kg	Ahn Jae-yeong; South Korea	Akhmet Alimbekov; Uzbekistan	Phan Văn Minh; Vietnam
Men's −81 kg	Ahn Jae-yeong; South Korea	Akhmet Alimbekov; Uzbekistan	Kumar Jaliev; Kyrgyzstan
Women's −52 kg	Nguyễn Thị Tuyết Dung; Vietnam	Zuhro Kholova; Tajikistan	Rajni Devi; Independent Olympic Athletes
Women's −52 kg	Nguyễn Thị Tuyết Dung; Vietnam	Zuhro Kholova; Tajikistan	Kim Min-kyoung; South Korea

== Medal table ==
Rank	Nation	Gold	Silver	Bronze	Total
1	Vietnam (VIE)	3	0	3	6
2	South Korea (KOR)	2	1	2	5
3	Kyrgyzstan (KGZ)	1	1	2	4
4	Kazakhstan (KAZ)	1	1	1	3
5	Iraq (IRQ)	1	0	1	2
5	Turkmenistan (TKM)	1	0	1	2
7	Jordan (JOR)	0	2	3	5
8	Uzbekistan (UZB)	0	2	1	3
9	Tajikistan (TJK)	0	1	1	2
10	Kuwait (KUW)	0	1	0	1
11	Independent Olympic Athletes (AOI)	0	0	1	1
11	Mongolia (MGL)	0	0	1	1
11	Palestine (PLE)	0	0	1	1
Totals (13 entries)		9	9	18	36

== Results ==
=== Point fighting ===
==== Men's 63 kg ====
Round of 16; 3 July
Shukhrat Kholikov (TJK)	11
Kim Jun-seong (KOR)	15

Quarterfinals; 4 July
Abdullah Shaaban (KUW)	7
Bilal Al-Hashash (JOR)	8
Nguyễn Hoàng Hiệp (VIE)
Azamat Abdiraimov (UZB)	RSC
Haidar Mohammed (IRQ)	15
Makarand Joshi (AOI)	7
Arman Aipov (KAZ)	7
Kim Jun-seong (KOR)	8

Semifinals; 5 July
Bilal Al-Hashash (JOR)	6
Azamat Abdiraimov (UZB)	8
Haidar Mohammed (IRQ)	6
Kim Jun-seong (KOR)	4

Final; 5 July
Azamat Abdiraimov (UZB)	2
Haidar Mohammed (IRQ)	6

==== Men's 74 kg ====
Quarterfinals; 4 July		Semifinals; 5 July		Final; 6 July
Husain Al-Banay (KUW)	7
Lee Seong-hyeon (KOR)	4	Husain Al-Banay (KUW)	9
Kakim Kairat (KAZ)	17	Kakim Kairat (KAZ)	7
Somveer Singh (AOI)	7			Husain Al-Banay (KUW)	4
Jakhongir Kuchmuradov (UZB)	5			Nguyễn Văn Sử (VIE)	5
Nguyễn Văn Sử (VIE)	15	Nguyễn Văn Sử (VIE)	10
Ahmed Karim (IRQ)	8	Ahmed Karim (IRQ)	1
Mohammad Al-Borini (JOR)	5

==== Women's 55 kg ====
Quarterfinals; 4 July
Shijirboldyn Sürenkhorloo (MGL)	1
Park Hye-young (KOR)	11
Ganjina Khabibullaeva (TJK)	10
Yambem Tala Chanu (AOI)	2
Sitora Nishanova (UZB)	8
Farah Hattab (JOR)	9

Semifinals; 5 July
Park Hye-young (KOR)	5
Ganjina Khabibullaeva (TJK)	3
Đào Thị Thoan (VIE)	7
Farah Hattab (JOR)	12

Final; 5 July
Park Hye-young (KOR)	9
Farah Hattab (JOR)	5

=== Full contact ===
==== Men's 57 kg ====
Round of 16; 3 July
Jarah Theweni (KUW)	0
Mohammed Mutar (IRQ)	3
Namjilmaagiin Bat-Erdene (MGL)	2
Ahmed Hamai (YEM)	1
Sukhrob Aydarbekov (TJK)	2
Ruslan Bayazitov (KAZ)	1
Ulanbek Kasymbekov (KGZ)	3
Kim Gyeong-cheol (KOR)	0

Quarterfinals; 4 July
Gurban Beghanow (TKM)	3
Mohammed Mutar (IRQ)	0
Vinod Sharma (AOI)	0
Namjilmaagiin Bat-Erdene (MGL)	3
Sukhrob Aydarbekov (TJK)	0
Ahmad Al-Jarajreh (JOR)	3
Nodir Israilov (UZB)
Ulanbek Kasymbekov (KGZ)	RET

Semifinals; 5 July
Gurban Beghanow (TKM)	3
Namjilmaagiin Bat-Erdene (MGL)	0
Ahmad Al-Jarajreh (JOR)	3
Ulanbek Kasymbekov (KGZ)	0

Final; 6 July
Gurban Beghanow (TKM)	2
Ahmad Al-Jarajreh (JOR)	1

- Jarah Theweni of Kuwait originally finished 9th, but was disqualified after he tested positive for Amiloride and Hydrochlorothiazide.

==== Men's 71 kg ====
Round of 16; 3 July
Park Dong-hwa (KOR)	DSQ
Dilshod Sadikov (UZB)
Sayan Zhakupov (KAZ)	KO
Tahyr Şaýmanow (TKM)
Trần Thành Ý (VIE)	3
Visal Kumar (AOI)	0
Stalbek Darkanbaev (KGZ)	3
Mohammad Khreis (SYR)	0

Quarterfinals; 4 July
Jehad Adwan (PLE)	1
Park Dong-hwa (KOR)	1
Nuriddin Saidov (TJK)
Sayan Zhakupov (KAZ)	WO
Fahad Al-Shammari (KUW)	1
Trần Thành Ý (VIE)	2
Hussein Karim (IRQ)	1
Stalbek Darkanbaev (KGZ)	2

Semifinals; 5 July
Jehad Adwan (PLE)
Sayan Zhakupov (KAZ)	RET
Trần Thành Ý (VIE)
Stalbek Darkanbaev (KGZ)	RET

Final; 6 July
Sayan Zhakupov (KAZ)	3
Stalbek Darkanbaev (KGZ)	0

==== Women's 56 kg ====
Quarterfinals; 4 July
Baraah Al-Absi (JOR)	2
Kang Ju-heui (KOR)	1
Ritu (AOI)
Tamara Temirbayeva (KAZ)	KO
Nguyễn Thị Tuyết Mai (VIE)	3
Sergelenbayaryn Myadagmaa (MGL)	0

Semifinals; 5 July
Baraah Al-Absi (JOR)	0
Tamara Temirbayeva (KAZ)	3
Shakhnoza Khujaniyozova (UZB)	0
Nguyễn Thị Tuyết Mai (VIE)	3

Final; 6 July
Tamara Temirbayeva (KAZ)	0
Nguyễn Thị Tuyết Mai (VIE)	3

=== Low kick ===
==== Men's 63.5 kg ====
Round of 16; 3 July
Mohit Bhardwaj (AOI)
Odil Fozili (TJK)	KO
Aday Abuhasoah (JOR)	3
Mohammad Shehadeh (SYR)	0
Jadambyn Mönkhbayar (MGL)	3
Omar Al-Rabiah (KUW)	0
Şöhrat Hallyýew (TKM)	3
Abdo Al-Nufiay (YEM)	0
Ahmed Hasan (IRQ)	3
Phan Văn Yên (VIE)	0
Aleksey Fedoseev (KGZ)	3
Artur Saurbayev (KAZ)	0

Quarterfinals; 4 July
Yu Hyun-woo (KOR)	3
Odil Fozili (TJK)	0
Soybjon Meliev (UZB)	0
Aday Abuhasoah (JOR)	2
Jadambyn Mönkhbayar (MGL)	0
Şöhrat Hallyýew (TKM)	3
Ahmed Hasan (IRQ)
Aleksey Fedoseev (KGZ)	WO

Semifinals; 5 July
Yu Hyun-woo (KOR)	3
Aday Abuhasoah (JOR)	0
Şöhrat Hallyýew (TKM)	0
Aleksey Fedoseev (KGZ)	3

Final; 6 July
Yu Hyun-woo (KOR)	1
Aleksey Fedoseev (KGZ)	2

==== Men's 81 kg ====
Round of 16; 3 July
Batmönkhiin Bürenzorig (MGL)	0
Allamyrat Annamyradow (TKM)	3
Jasvir (AOI)
Ahn Jae-yeong (KOR)	KO
Rikan Lateef (IRQ)	0
Jarrah Zeyad (JOR)	3

Quarterfinals; 4 July
Ruslan Ganza (KAZ)	1
Phan Văn Minh (VIE)	2
Akhmet Alimbekov (UZB)	2
Allamyrat Annamyradow (TKM)	0
Abdullah Habib (KUW)
Ahn Jae-yeong (KOR)	RET
Kumar Jaliev (KGZ)	2
Jarrah Zeyad (JOR)	1

Semifinals; 5 July
Phan Văn Minh (VIE)	0
Akhmet Alimbekov (UZB)	3
Ahn Jae-yeong (KOR)	3
Kumar Jaliev (KGZ)	0

Final; 6 July
Akhmet Alimbekov (UZB)	0
Ahn Jae-yeong (KOR)	2

==== Women's 52 kg ====
Quarterfinals; 4 July
Zhadyra Kuanysheva (KAZ)	0
Zuhro Kholova (TJK)	3
Nguyễn Thị Tuyết Dung (VIE)	3
Ironakhon Karimova (UZB)	0

Semifinals; 5 July
Rajni Devi (AOI)	0
Zuhro Kholova (TJK)	3
Kim Min-kyoung (KOR)	0
Nguyễn Thị Tuyết Dung (VIE)	3

Final; 6 July
Zuhro Kholova (TJK)	0
Nguyễn Thị Tuyết Dung (VIE)	3

- Zhadyra Kuanysheva of Kazakhstan originally finished 5th, but was disqualified after she tested positive for Furosemide.
