= Deria Nur Haliza =

Indonesian tennis player

- Country (sports): Indonesia
- Born: 8 June 1997 (age 28) Grobogan Regency, Indonesia
- Plays: Right-handed (two handed-backhand)
- Prize money: $5,818

Singles
- Career record: 6–9
- Career titles: 0
- Highest ranking: No. 884 (6 April 2015)
- Current ranking: No. 892 (5 January 2015)

Grand Slam singles results
- Australian Open Junior: 1R (2015)
- Wimbledon Junior: 2R (2015)

Doubles
- Career record: 1–4
- Career titles: 0

Grand Slam doubles results
- Australian Open Junior: 2R (2015)
Medal record
Representing Indonesia
Women's tennis
Asian Indoor and Martial Arts Games
Bronze medal – third place	2017 Ashgabat	Mixed doubles
- Last updated on: 21 November 2018.

Deria Nur Haliza (born 8 June 1997) is an Indonesian tennis player. Nur Haliza has a career high WTA singles ranking of 892 achieved on 5 January 2015. Playing for Indonesia in Fed Cup, Nur Haliza has a W/L ratio of 0–1.

== ITF Junior Circuit finals ==
=== Singles: 4 (3 titles, 1 runner-up) ===
Legend Category GA Category G1 Category G2 Category G3 Category G4 Category G5	Finals by surface Hard (3–1) Clay (0–0) Grass (0–0) Carpet (0–0)

Result	W–L	Date	Tournament	Tier	Surface	Opponent	Score
Win	1–0	Jun 2013	ITF Solo, Indonesia	G4	Hard	(Indonesia) Tami Grende	6–2, 7–5
Win	2–0	May 2014	ITF Beijing, China	G3	Hard	(China) Liang Minying	7–5, 6–1
Win	3–0	Jun 2014	ITF Jakarta, Indonesia	G4	Hard	(Philippines) Khim Iglupas	6–0, 6–2
Loss	3–1	Mar 2015	ITF Nonthaburi, Thailand	G1	Hard	(India) Pranjala Yadlapalli	4–6, 1–6

=== Doubles: 4 (4 runner-ups) ===
Legend Category GA Category G1 Category G2 Category G3 Category G4 Category G5	Finals by surface Hard (0–4) Clay (0–0) Grass (0–0) Carpet (0–0)

Result	W–L	Date	Tournament	Tier	Surface	Partner	Opponents	Score
Loss	0–1	Oct 2011	ITF Surabaya, Indonesia	G4	Hard	(Indonesia) Vita Mediana	(Indonesia) Tria Rizki Amalia (Indonesia) Efriliya Herlina	3–6, 6–7^{(0–7)}
Loss	0–2	Oct 2012	ITF Surabaya, Indonesia	G4	Hard	(Indonesia) Efriliya Herlina	(Netherlands) Arianne Hartono (South Korea) Seon Young Um	4–6, 6–1, [8–10]
Loss	0–3	Jun 2013	ITF Solo, Indonesia	G4	Hard	(Thailand) Yada Vasupongchai	(Indonesia) Tami Grende (Indonesia) Rifanty Kahfiani	3–6, 6–7^{(5–7)}
Loss	0–4	Mar 2015	ITF Nonthaburi, Thailand	G1	Hard	(India) Pranjala Yadlapalli	(Japan) Mayuka Aikawa (Australia) Olivia Tjandramulia	2–6, 6–3, [8–10]

== National representation ==
=== Multi-sport event ===
Nur Haliza made her debut representing Indonesia in multi-sports event at the 2017 Southeast Asian Games.

==== Mixed doubles: 1 (bronze) ====
Result	Date	Tournament	Surface	Partner	Opponents	Score
Bronze	Sep 2017	Asian Indoor and Martial Arts Games, Ashgabat	Hard	(Indonesia) Muhammad Rifqi Fitriadi	(Thailand) Nuttanon Kadchapanan (Thailand) Nicha Lertpitaksinchai	3–6, 1–6
