= Asian Indoor and Martial Arts Games =

Pancontinental multi-sport event

- Official logo
- 2005; 2007; 2009; 2013; 2017; 2021; 2026

Asian Indoor and Martial Arts Games
- Abbreviation: AIMAG
- Frequency: Every four years
- Inaugurated: 2005 Asian Indoor Games in Bangkok (Thailand)
- Most recent: 2017 Asian Indoor and Martial Arts Games in Ashgabat (Turkmenistan)
- Next event: 2026 Asian Indoor and Martial Arts Games in Riyadh (Saudi Arabia)

The Asian Indoor and Martial Arts Games (abbreviated as AIMAG) is a pancontinental multi-sport event held every four years among athletes from all over Asia. It is organised by the Olympic Council of Asia (OCA) and consists of Indoor and martial arts events with TV broadcasting potential, some of which were not contested at the Asian Games and Asian Winter Games Programs and are not Olympic sports.

The event is a merger of two formerly separate OCA-sanctioned events – Asian Indoor Games (abbreviated as AIG) and Asian Martial Arts Games (abbreviated as AMAG), first held in Bangkok, Thailand in 2005 and 2009 respectively. Both events merged to form the present-day event in 2013, with the subsequent editions inheriting the edition numeral of the former. These Games are described as the second largest Asian multi-sport event after the Asian Games.

In its history, five nations have hosted the Asian Indoor and Martial Arts Games and sixty-three nations from Asia and Oceania and two teams have participated in the event. The last Games were held in Ashgabat, Turkmenistan 17–27 September 2017, while the next edition are scheduled to be held in Riyadh, Saudi Arabia in 2026.

== History ==
The Asian Indoor Games consisted of indoor sports with TV broadcasting potential, several of which are not included in the Asian Games and Winter Asian Games Programs and are not Olympic sports. The sports program included electronic sports, extreme sports, aerobics, acrobatics, indoor athletics, dance sports, futsal, inline hockey, finswimming, and 25 metres short course swimming. The 2007 Asian Indoor Games in Macau also saw the first major test of FIBA 3x3, a formalized version of three-on-three basketball that saw its official worldwide debut at the 2010 Youth Olympics. FIBA 3x3 was also contested in the 2009 Games.

Doha was given the rights to hold the fourth edition scheduled for 2011, but a year later, in June 2008, the Qatar Olympic Committee officially withdrew as host citing "unforeseen circumstances". In response, the OCA said that the 2009 Asian Indoor Games would be the last edition of the games. The Asian Indoor Games and the Asian Martial Arts Games would then combine, becoming the quadrennial Asian Indoor and Martial Arts Games. The inaugural event was held in Incheon, South Korea in 2013.

== Participating nations ==
All 45 countries whose National Olympic Committees are recognized by the Olympic Council of Asia and 18 countries whose National Olympic Committees are recognized by the Oceania National Olympic Committees.

=== Asia ===
- Afghanistan
- Bahrain
- Bangladesh
- Bhutan
- Brunei
- Cambodia
- China
- Hong Kong
- India
- Indonesia
- Iran
- Iraq
- Japan
- Jordan
- Kazakhstan
- North Korea
- South Korea
- Kuwait
- Kyrgyzstan
- Laos
- Lebanon
- Macau
- Malaysia
- Maldives
- Mongolia
- Myanmar
- Nepal
- Oman
- Pakistan
- Palestine
- Philippines
- Qatar
- Saudi Arabia
- Singapore
- Sri Lanka
- Syria
- Chinese Taipei
- Tajikistan
- Thailand
- Timor-Leste
- Turkmenistan
- United Arab Emirates
- Uzbekistan
- Vietnam
- Yemen

=== Oceania ===
- American Samoa
- Australia
- Cook Islands
- Fiji
- Tahiti
- Guam
- Kiribati
- Federated States of Micronesia
- Marshall Islands
- Nauru
- New Caledonia
- Palau
- Papua New Guinea
- Samoa
- Solomon Islands
- Tonga
- Tuvalu
- Vanuatu

=== Others ===
- Independent Olympic Athletes
- Refugee Team

== List of Asian Indoor and Martial Arts Games ==
Host cities of the Asian Indoor and Martial Arts Games

Edition	Year	Host City	Host nation	Opened by	Start Date	End Date	Nations	Competitors	Sports	Events	Top Placed Team	Ref.
Asian Indoor Games
I	2005	Bangkok	Thailand	Crown Prince Vajiralongkorn	12 November	19 November	45	2,343	9	120	China (CHN)	
II	2007	Macau	Macau	Chief Executive Edmund Ho	26 October	3 November	44	2,476	17	171	China (CHN)	
III	2009	Hanoi	Vietnam	President Nguyễn Minh Triết	30 October	8 November	42	2,396	24	215	China (CHN)	
—	~~2011~~	Originally awarded to Doha, eventually cancelled by the Olympic Council of Asia										
Asian Martial Arts Games
I	2009	Bangkok	Thailand	Crown Prince Vajiralongkorn	1 August	9 August	40	810	9	109	Thailand (THA)	
Asian Indoor and Martial Arts Games
IV	2013	Incheon	South Korea	Prime Minister Chung Hong-won	29 June	6 July	43	1,652	12	100	China (CHN)	
V	2017	Ashgabat	Turkmenistan	President Gurbanguly Berdimuhamedow	17 September	27 September	63	4,012	21	341	Turkmenistan (TKM)	
—	~~2021~~	Originally awarded to Bangkok and Chonburi, eventually cancelled by the Olympic Council of Asia										
VI	2026	Riyadh	Saudi Arabia	Future event	28 March 2027	8 April 2027	Future event		18	122	Future event	
VII	2030											

=== Future ===
As of October 2026, Mongolia and the Philippines are bidding to host the 2030 Asian Indoor and Martial Arts Games.

== Sports ==
Sport	Discipline	Type	Years
Aquatics	Short course swimming	Indoor	2005–2017
Archery	Indoor archery	Indoor	2009 only
Athletics	Indoor athletics	Indoor	2005–2009, 2017
Basketball	3x3 basketball	Indoor	2007, 2009, since 2017
Bowling		Indoor	2007–2017
Boxing		Martial arts	2009, 2026
Chess		Indoor	since 2007
Cue sports	Billiards	Indoor	since 2007
Cue sports	Carom	Indoor	since 2007
Cue sports	Pool	Indoor	since 2007
Cue sports	Russian pyramid	Indoor	2017
Cue sports	Snooker	Indoor	since 2007
Cycling	Artistic cycling	Indoor	2005–2007
Cycling	BMX freestyle	Indoor	2005–2007
Cycling	Cycle ball	Indoor	2005–2007
Cycling	Track cycling	Indoor	2017
Dancesport	Latin	Indoor	2005–2017
Dancesport	Salsa	Indoor	2017
Dancesport	Standard	Indoor	2005–2017
Dragon dance		Indoor	2007–2009
Equestrian	Jumping	Others	2017
Esports		Indoor	2007–2013, 2017, 2026
Finswimming		Indoor	2007–2009
Football	Futsal	Indoor	all
Go		Indoor	2013
Gymnastics	Aerobic gymnastics	Indoor	2005–2009
Handball		Indoor	2026
Hockey	Indoor hockey	Indoor	2007
Inline skating	Aggressive inline skating	Indoor	2005–2007
Judo		Martial arts	2009 AMAG, 2026
Ju-jitsu	Duo	Martial arts	2009, since 2017, AMAG
Ju-jitsu	Fighting	Martial arts	2009, since 2017, AMAG
Ju-jitsu	Ne waza	Martial arts	since 2017
Kabaddi		Indoor	2007–2013

Sport	Discipline	Type	Years
Karate	Kumite	Martial arts	2009 AMAG, 2026
Kickboxing	Full contact	Martial arts	2007, 2013–2017, AMAG
Kickboxing	Kick light	Martial arts	2017
Kickboxing	Low kick	Martial arts	2007, 2009–2017, AMAG
Kickboxing	Point fighting	Martial arts	2007, 2009–2017
Kurash		Martial arts	2007, 2009–2017, AMAG
Lion dance	Northern lion	Indoor	2007–2009
Lion dance	Southern lion	Indoor	2007–2009
Mixed martial arts		Martial arts	2026
Muaythai		Martial arts	all, AMAG
Padel		Indoor	2026
Pétanque		Indoor	2009
Sambo	Combat	Martial arts	2017
Sambo	Sport	Martial arts	2017
Sepak takraw	Hoop takraw	Indoor	2005–2009
Shuttlecock		Indoor	2009
Skateboarding		Indoor	2005–2007
Sport climbing		Indoor	2005–2007
Taekwondo	Kyorugi	Martial arts	since 2017, AMAG
Taekwondo	Poomsae	Martial arts	since 2017
Tennis		Indoor	2017
Teqball		Indoor	2026
Vovinam	Fighting	Martial arts	2009
Vovinam	Performance	Martial arts	2009
Weightlifting		Indoor	since 2017
Wrestling	Alysh belt wrestling	Martial arts	2017
Wrestling	Belt wrestling	Martial arts	2009, 2017
Wrestling	Freestyle wrestling	Martial arts	since 2017
Wrestling	Greco-Roman wrestling	Martial arts	since 2017
Wrestling	Kazakh kuresi	Martial arts	2017
Wrestling	Pahlavani wrestling	Martial arts	2017
Wrestling	Turkmen goresh	Martial arts	2017
Wushu	Duilian	Martial arts	2009, AMAG
Wushu	Sanda	Martial arts	2009, AMAG
Xiangqi		Indoor	2007–2009

== All-time medal table ==
Rank	Nation	Gold	Silver	Bronze	Total
1	China (CHN)	204	119	96	419
2	Thailand (THA)	108	106	145	359
3	Kazakhstan (KAZ)	103	92	110	305
4	Turkmenistan (TKM)	92	75	89	256
5	South Korea (KOR)	77	79	76	232
6	Vietnam (VIE)	72	62	86	220
7	Iran (IRI)	63	53	85	201
8	Hong Kong (HKG)	46	44	60	150
9	Uzbekistan (UZB)	44	60	110	214
10	India (IND)	34	40	85	159
11	Japan (JPN)	33	29	47	109
12	Chinese Taipei (TPE)	28	29	59	116
13	Indonesia (INA)	16	16	42	74
14	Kyrgyzstan (KGZ)	14	23	42	79
15	Qatar (QAT)	12	12	11	35
16	Saudi Arabia (KSA)	10	9	4	23
17	United Arab Emirates (UAE)	10	5	14	29
18	Philippines (PHI)	8	26	35	69
19	Macau (MAC)	8	14	16	38
20	Mongolia (MGL)	7	17	29	53
21	Iraq (IRQ)	7	11	22	40
22	Malaysia (MAS)	6	13	19	38
23	Jordan (JOR)	5	11	32	48
24	Pakistan (PAK)	5	7	21	33
25	Laos (LAO)	4	18	29	51
26	Tajikistan (TJK)	4	17	35	56
27	Singapore (SGP)	4	17	19	40
28	Bahrain (BRN)	4	4	5	13
29	Afghanistan (AFG)	3	5	23	31
30	Syria (SYR)	3	3	12	18
31	Independent Olympic Athletes (AOI)	2	4	5	11
32	Kuwait (KUW)	1	9	14	24
33	Sri Lanka (SRI)	1	5	5	11
34	Cambodia (CAM)	1	4	7	12
35	Lebanon (LBN)	1	1	11	13
36	Fiji (FIJ)	1	1	0	2
37	Myanmar (MYA)	0	3	4	7
38	Marshall Islands (MHL)	0	1	0	1
39	Australia (AUS)	0	0	2	2
39	Bangladesh (BAN)	0	0	2	2
39	North Korea (PRK)	0	0	2	2
42	Bhutan (BHU)	0	0	1	1
42	Nepal (NEP)	0	0	1	1
42	Oman (OMA)	0	0	1	1
42	Palestine (PLE)	0	0	1	1
42	Samoa (SAM)	0	0	1	1
Totals (46 entries)		1,041	1,044	1,515	3,600

== See also ==
- Asian Games
- Asian Winter Games
- Asian Beach Games
- Asian Youth Games
