= Haidar Mohammed Al-Asadi =

Iraqi kickboxer

Haidar Mohammed
- Born: November 18, 1986 (age 39); Basra, Iraq
- Nationality: Iraq
- Height: 1.72 m (5 ft 7 1/2 in)
- Weight: 63 kg (139 lb; 9.9 st)
- Style: Point fighting
- Fighting out of: Basra, Iraq

Haidar Mohammed Alasadi (born November 18, 1986), is an Iraqi kickboxer. He is the 2013 Asian Indoor and Martial Arts Games Champion, former Arabian Champion, former Asian Champion of 2012 in Kickboxing and qualified for the 2013 World Combat Games but lost at the quarter finals.

== Titles and accomplishments ==
- 2017 Asian Indoor and Martial Arts Games (-69 kg) Silver medalist
- 2017 Asian Kickboxing Championships(63 kg)Bronze medalist
- 2016 Arabian Kickboxing Championship (-63 kg) Champion
- 2013 Qualified for the 2013 World Combat Games (-63 kg)
- 2013 Asian Indoor and Martial Arts Games (-63 kg) Champion
- 2012 Asian Kickboxing Championships(63 kg)Champion Champion
- 2011 Arabian Clubs Championship (-63 kg) Silver medalist

== Kickboxing record ==
Amateur Kickboxing Record
9 Wins, 5 Losses
Date	Result	Opponent	Event	Location	Method	Round	Time
2017-09-25	Loss	(Iran) Mostafa Pourfaraj	2017 Asian Indoor and Martial Arts Games, Point Fighting Final -69 kg	Ashgabat, Turkmenistan	Decision (2-11)	3	2:00
Wins 2017 Asian Indoor and Martial Arts Games Point Fighting Silver Medal -69 kg.
2017-09-25	Win	(Uzbekistan) Khumoyun Farmonov	2017 Asian Indoor and Martial Arts Games, Point Fighting Semi Finals -69 kg	Ashgabat, Turkmenistan	Decision (9-8)	3	2:00
2017-09-24	Win	(Jordan) Omar Abu-Rub	2017 Asian Indoor and Martial Arts Games, Point Fighting Quarter Finals -69 kg	Ashgabat, Turkmenistan	Decision (13-11)	3	2:00
2017-04-28	Loss	(Turkmenistan) Alisher Akhmedov	2017 Asian Kickboxing Championships, Point Fighting Final -63 kg	Ashgabat, Turkmenistan	Decision (4-13)	3	2:00
Wins 2017 Asian Kickboxing Championships Point Fighting Bronze Medal -63 kg.
2017-04-27	Win	(India) Biyush Milind Rajhans	2017 Asian Kickboxing Championships, Point Fighting Quarter Finals -63 kg	Ashgabat, Turkmenistan	Decision (6-2)	3	2:00
2013-12-03	Loss	(Bulgaria) Mincho Hadjiev	W.A.K.O. World Championships 2013 (Antalya), Point Fighting 1st Round -63 kg	Antalya, Turkey	Decision (2-12)	2	
2013-10-21	Loss	(South Africa) Ryan Donovan Phillips	2013 World Combat Games, Point Fighting Quarter Finals -63 kg	St. Petersburg, Russia	Decision (3-13)	2	1:41
2013-07-06	Win	(Uzbekistan) Azamat Abdiraimov	2013 Asian Indoor and Martial Arts Games, Point Fighting Final -63 kg	Incheon, Korea	Decision (6-2)	3	2:00
Wins 2013 Asian Indoor and Martial Arts Games Point Fighting Gold Medal -63 kg.
2013-07-05	Win	(South Korea) Kim Jun-seong	2013 Asian Indoor and Martial Arts Games, Point Fighting Semi Finals -63 kg	Incheon, Korea	Decision (6-4)	3	2:00
2013-07-04	Win	(India) Makarand Joshi	2013 Asian Indoor and Martial Arts Games, Point Fighting Quarter Finals -63 kg	Incheon, Korea	Decision (15-7)	3	2:00
2012-12-28	Win	(India) Singh Deepak	2012 Asian Kickboxing Championships, Point Fighting Final -63 kg	Pune, India	Decision	3	2:00
Wins 2012 Asian Kickboxing Championships Point Fighting Gold Medal -63 kg.
2012-12-27	Win	(South Korea) Kim Yoon Jin	2012 Asian Kickboxing Championships, Point Fighting Semi Finals -63 kg	Pune, India	Decision	3	2:00
2011-12-24	Loss	(Kuwait) Faisal Al-Turki	2011 Arabian Clubs Championship, Point Fighting Final -63 kg	Amman, Jordan	Decision	3	2:00
Wins 2011 Arabian Clubs Championship Point Fighting Silver Medal -63 kg.
2011-12-24	Win	(Jordan) Fadi Al-Nehar	2011 Arabian Clubs Championship, Point Fighting Final -63 kg	Amman, Jordan	Decision	3	2:00
Legend: Win Loss Draw/No contest Notes
