= Tuvalu at the 2017 Asian Indoor and Martial Arts Games =

- IOC code: TUV
- NOC: Tuvalu Association of Sports and National Olympic Committee
- Website: www.oceaniasport.com/tuvalu

in Ashgabat 17–27 September
- Competitors: 8 in 4 sports
- Medals: Gold 0 Silver 0 Bronze 0 Total 0

Asian Indoor and Martial Arts Games appearances
- 2017; 2021; 2026

Tuvalu competed at the 2017 Asian Indoor and Martial Arts Games held in Ashgabat, Turkmenistan from September 17 to 27. Tuvalu sent a delegation consisting of 8 competitors for the event competing in 4 different sports. Tuvaluan team couldn't receive any medal in the competition.

Tuvalu along with other Oceania nations competed in the Asian Indoor and Martial Arts Games for the first time in history.

== Participants ==
Sport	Men	Women	Total
Indoor tennis	2	1	3
Weightlifting	2	0	2
Indoor Athletics	1	1	2
Taekwondo	1	0	1
