= Vanuatu at the 2017 Asian Indoor and Martial Arts Games =

- IOC code: VAN
- NOC: Vanuatu Association of Sports and National Olympic Committee
- Website: www.oceaniasport.com/vanuatu

in Ashgabat 17–27 September
- Competitors: 13 in 3 sports
- Medals: Gold 0 Silver 0 Bronze 0 Total 0

Asian Indoor and Martial Arts Games appearances
- 2017; 2021; 2025

Vanuatu competed at the 2017 Asian Indoor and Martial Arts Games held in Ashgabat, Turkmenistan from September 17 to 27. Vanuatuan team sent a delegation consisting of 13 competitors for the event competing in 3 different sports. Vanuatu couldn't receive any medal in the competition.

Vanuatu along with other Oceania nations competed in the Asian Indoor and Martial Arts Games for the first time in history.

== Participants ==
Sport	Men	Women	Total
Indoor tennis	3	3	6
Indoor Athletics	5	0	5
Taekwondo	2	0	2
