= Kiribati at the 2017 Asian Indoor and Martial Arts Games =

- IOC code: KIR
- NOC: Kiribati National Olympic Committee
- Website: www.oceaniasport.com/kiribati

in Ashgabat 17–27 September
- Competitors: 12 in 3 sports
- Medals: Gold 0 Silver 0 Bronze 0 Total 0

Asian Indoor and Martial Arts Games appearances
- 2017; 2021; 2025

Kiribati competed at the 2017 Asian Indoor and Martial Arts Games held in Ashgabat, Turkmenistan from September 17-27. Kiribati sent a delegation of 12 competitors in 3 different sports. Kiribati couldn't receive any medal at the Games.

Kiribati made its first appearance at an Asian Indoor and Martial Arts Games for the first time along with other Oceania nations.

== Participants ==
Sport	Men	Women	Total
Wrestling	4	1	5
Indoor Athletics	4	0	4
Indoor tennis	2	1	3
