= United Arab Emirates at the 2011 Asian Winter Games =

- IOC code: UAE
- NOC: United Arab Emirates National Olympic Committee

in Astana and Almaty
- Competitors: 23 in 1 sport
- Medals: Gold 0 Silver 0 Bronze 0 Total 0

Asian Winter Games appearances
- 2007; 2011; 2017; 2025; 2029

United Arab Emirates will participate in the 2011 Asian Winter Games in Almaty and Astana, Kazakhstan from January 30, 2011 to February 6, 2011.

== Ice hockey ==
Men

The team is in the premier division for these games.

=== Premier Division ===
Rank	Team	Pld	W	OW	OL	L	GF	GA	GD	Pts
6	Kyrgyzstan	6	6	0	0	0	95	23	+72	18
7	Thailand	6	5	0	0	1	70	22	+48	15
8	United Arab Emirates	6	4	0	0	2	48	27	+21	12
9	Mongolia	6	3	0	0	3	35	37	−2	9
10	Malaysia	6	2	0	0	4	46	59	−13	6
11	Athletes from Kuwait	6	1	0	0	5	41	40	+1	3
12	Bahrain	6	0	0	0	6	11	138	−127	0

Matches

January 29; 13:30	United Arab Emirates	0 – 14 (0–3, 0–6, 0–5)	Kyrgyzstan	Kazakhstan Sports Palace 2, Astana; Attendance: 200

http://info.astana-almaty2011.kz/en/Root.mvc/ViewPdf/IHM500A04_C74_3.0.pdf

Ahmed Al-Dhaheri (out 35:21)
Khaled Al-Suwaidi (in 35:21)
Goalies
Sergey Ossintsev
Referee:
Nikita Zalipyatskikh (KAZ)

0–1	06:37 – Kolobov (Shiderinov, Fillippov) (PP)
0–2	17:26 – Kryukov (Kolobov, Falfudinov) (PP)
0–3	19:05 – Zhuravlyov (Fillippov)
0–4	22:24 – Kabanov (S. Sorokin, Zhuravlyov)
0–5	33:26 – Kryukov (Ossintsev, Kabanov)
0–6	34:04 – Falfudinov (Kolobov, Kryukov)
0–7	35:21 – Zhuravlyov (Sazonov, Kabanov)
0–8	37:09 – Kabanov (Zhuravlyov) (SH)
0–9	37:25 – Kolobov (Alexeyev) (SH)
0–10	41:36 – S. Sorokin (Zhuravlyov, V. Sorokin)
0–11	42:27 – Kryukov (PS)
0–12	43:22 – Shiderinov (Kryukov, Kolobov)
0–13	48:01 – Kolobov (Fillippov) (PP2)
0–14	53:43 – Zhuravlyov (S. Sorokin) (SH)

40 min
Penalties
18 min
21
Shots
70

January 31; 13:30	United Arab Emirates	25 – 0 (9–0, 6–0, 10–0)	Bahrain	Kazakhstan Sports Palace 2, Astana; Attendance: 200

http://info.astana-almaty2011.kz/en/Root.mvc/ViewPdf/IHM500A07_C74_3.0.pdf

Ahmed Al-Dhaheri (out 33:45)
Khaled Al-Suwaidi (in 33:45)
Goalies
Abdulla Al-Adhab
Referee:
Kimikazu Koizumi (JPN)

J. Al-Dhaheri – 00:06	1–0
J. Al-Dhaheri (Al-Darmaki) – 01:04	2–0
Al-Nuaimi (Al-Jachi) (SH) – 07:35	3–0
Al-Mheiri (M. Al-Shamisi) (SH) – 07:48	4–0
Al. Al-Mazrouei (J. Al-Dhaheri, Al-Darmaki) – 08:55	5–0
M. Al-Shamisi (Al-Jachi) – 11:33	6–0
J. Al-Dhaheri (Al-Mheiri) (SH) – 15:39	7–0
Al-Darmaki (Al. Al-Mazrouei, J. Al-Dhaheri) – 17:44	8–0
Al-Mheiri (Al-Jachi, O. Al-Shamisi) (PP) – 19:13	9–0
Al-Nuaimi (F. Al-Suwaidi) – 22:18	10–0
M. Al-Mazrouei (Al-Nuaimi) – 29:02	11–0
Al-Baloushi (M. Al-Shamisi, Al-Sarour) – 30:55	12–0
Al-Sarour (M. Al-Shamisi) – 33:54	13–0
M. Al-Shamisi (Al-Baloushi, Al-Sarour) (PP) – 35:58	14–0
Al-Subousi – 37:21	15–0
Al-Baloushi (Al. Al-Mazrouei) – 42:24	16–0
Al-Nuaimi (M. Al-Shamisi) – 44:36	17–0
O. Al-Shamisi (J. Al-Dhaheri) – 47:54	18–0
Al. Al-Mazrouei (J. Al-Dhaheri) – 48:15	19–0
Al-Nuaimi – 48:52	20–0
Al-Nuaimi (O. Al-Shamisi, Al-Mheiri) – 50:07	21–0
Al-Darmaki (Bu-Debs, Al. Al-Mazrouei) – 51:59	22–0
Al-Nuaimi (J. Al-Dhaheri) – 53:43	23–0
O. Al-Shamisi (SH) – 59:02	24–0
J. Al-Dhaheri (Al-Nuaimi) – 59:49	25–0

8 min
Penalties
16 min
66
Shots
3

February 1; 20:30	Athletes from Kuwait	2 – 5 (0–2, 1–1, 1–2)	United Arab Emirates	Kazakhstan Sports Palace 2, Astana; Attendance: 200

http://info.astana-almaty2011.kz/en/Root.mvc/ViewPdf/IHM500A12_C74_3.0.pdf

Jasem Al-Sarraf
Goalies
Ahmed Al-Dhaheri
Referee:
Andrey Sachuk (KAZ)

	0–1	10:11 – Al-Baloushi (Bu-Debs) (PP)
	0–2	12:23 – Al-Mheiri (Al-Jachi, O. Al-Shamisi)
	0–3	24:33 – Al. Al-Mazrouei (J. Al-Dhaheri)
Shetail – 32:27	1–3
	1–4	42:02 – J. Al-Dhaheri
	1–5	52:45 – Al-Haddad (O. Al-Shamisi) (PP)
Mo. Al-Ajmi (PP) – 59:35	2–5

12 min
Penalties
12 min
16
Shots
27

February 2; 17:00	United Arab Emirates	9 – 1 (0–0, 6–1, 3–0)	Mongolia	Kazakhstan Sports Palace 2, Astana; Attendance: 300

http://info.astana-almaty2011.kz/en/Root.mvc/ViewPdf/IHM500A14_C74_3.0.pdf

Ahmed Al-Dhaheri
Goalies
Batsukh Battur (out 32:01)
Bazarvaani Baatarkhuu (in 32:01)
Referee:
Kimikazu Koizumi (JPN)

J. Al-Dhaheri – 24:55	1–0
	1–1	26:58 – Purev-Ochir (Batzaya) (PP)
Al-Haddad (J. Al-Dhaheri) – 29:14	2–1
J. Al-Dhaheri (Al-Mheiri) – 29:24	3–1
Al-Haddad (M. Al-Shamisi, J. Al-Dhaheri) – 32:01	4–1
J. Al-Dhaheri (Al-Haddad) (PP) – 34:04	5–1
O. Al-Shamisi (J. Al-Dhaheri) – 39:37	6–1
Al. Al-Mazrouei (J. Al-Dhaheri) – 41:36	7–1
Al-Jachi (J. Al-Dhaheri) (SH) – 44:51	8–1
Al. Al-Mazrouei (Al-Jachi) – 53:32	9–1

20 min
Penalties
18 min
38
Shots
10

February 4; 20:30	Malaysia	1 – 7 (0–1, 1–2, 0–4)	United Arab Emirates	Kazakhstan Sports Palace 2, Astana; Attendance: 200

http://info.astana-almaty2011.kz/en/Root.mvc/ViewPdf/IHM500A18_C74_3.0.pdf

Tengku Mohd Azlly
Goalies
Ahmed Al-Dhaheri
Referee:
Keith Fong (CAN)

	0–1	14:22 – J. Al-Dhaheri (Al-Jachi, O. Al-Shamisi)
	0–2	24:55 – Al-Mheiri (SH)
	0–3	31:32 – O. Al-Shamisi (Al-Subousi)
David (Yap E.J., Loke B.K.) (PP) – 38:01	1–3
	1–4	44:19 – Al. Al-Mazrouei (Al-Jachi) (PP2)
	1–5	48:57 – Bu-Debs (J. Al-Dhaheri) (PP)
	1–6	50:22 – Al-Nuaimi (Al-Muharami)
	1–7	58:46 – O. Al-Shamisi

16 min
Penalties
22 min
14
Shots
44

February 5; 20:30	United Arab Emirates	2 – 9 (0–1, 2–5, 0–3)	Thailand	Kazakhstan Sports Palace 2, Astana; Attendance: 300

http://info.astana-almaty2011.kz/en/Root.mvc/ViewPdf/IHM500A21_C74_3.0.pdf

Ahmed Al-Dhaheri (out 33:38)
Khaled Al-Suwaidi (in 33:38)
Goalies
Jason Cotsmire
Referee:
Andrey Sachuk (KAZ)

	0–1	13:27 – Chartsuwan (PS)
Al. Al-Mazrouei (J. Al-Dhaheri) – 24:01	1–1
	1–2	24:34 – Chartsuwan (Aarola)
Al-Darmaki (Al-Nuaimi, T. Al-Shamisi) – 25:11	2–2
	2–3	25:45 – Chartsuwan (Aarola)
	2–4	26:29 – Chartsuwan (Aarola)
	2–5	33:38 – Aarola (Ct. Supadilokluk)
	2–6	38:21 – Kasemsunt (Aarola) (PP)
	2–7	44:06 – Rattanachot (Aarola, Neimwan)
	2–8	48:38 – Tengsakul (Thamwongsin)
	2–9	57:41 – Rattanachot (Ongvisagepaiboon)

18 min
Penalties
12 min
18
Shots
31
