= United Arab Emirates at the 2025 Asian Winter Games =

- Flag of United Arab Emirates
- IOC code: UAE
- NOC: United Arab Emirates National Olympic Committee

in Harbin, China 7 February 2025 – 14 February 2025
- Competitors: 7 in 3 sports
- Flag bearers: Sultan Al-Ghandi & Amenah Al-Muhairi
- Medals: Gold 0 Silver 0 Bronze 0 Total 0

Asian Winter Games appearances
- 2007; 2011; 2017; 2025; 2029

The United Arab Emirates competed at the 2025 Asian Winter Games in Harbin, China, from February 7 to 14. The team from the United Arab Emirates consisted of seven athletes competing in three sports. Freestyle skier Sultan Al Ghandi and snowboarder Amenah Al Muhairi were the country's flagbearers during the opening ceremony.

== Competitors ==
The following table lists the Emirati delegation per sport and gender.

Sport	Men	Women	Total
Alpine skiing	3	0	3
Freestyle skiing	2	0	2
Snowboarding	1	1	2
Total	6	1	7

== Alpine skiing ==
The United Arab Emirates entered three male alpine skiers.

Men

Athlete	Event	Run 1		Run 2		Total	
Athlete	Event	Time	Rank	Time	Rank	Time	Rank
Abdullah Al Balushi	Slalom	1:08.28	42	1:07.50	36	2:15.78	36
Hassan Al Fardan	Slalom	Did not finish					
Alexander Astridge	Slalom	51.70	19	52.10	17	1:43.80	17

== Freestyle skiing ==
The United Arab Emirates entered two male freestyle skiers.

Men

Athlete	Event	Qualification				Final
Athlete	Event	Run 1	Run 2	Run 3	Best	Rank
Sultan Al-Ghandi	Slopestyle	56.25	DNI	DNI	56.25	8
Abdulla Al-Rasheed	Slopestyle	60.75	DNI	DNI	60.75	7

== Snowboarding ==
The United Arab Emirates entered two snowboarders (one per gender). Amenah Al-Muhairi was the only women to represent the country at the games.

Athlete	Event	Qualification				Final				
Athlete	Event	Run 1	Run 2	Best	Rank	Run 1	Run 2	Run 3	Best	Rank
Humaid Al-Ansari	Men's slopestyle	23.50	DNI	23.50	9	Did not advance				
Amenah Al-Muhairi	Women's slopestyle	—N/a				26.75	28.25	DNI	28.25	6

== See also ==
- United Arab Emirates at the 2024 Winter Youth Olympics
