= 2026 Asian Indoor and Martial Arts Games =

Asian Indoor and Martial Arts Games

- Host city: Riyadh, Saudi Arabia
- Motto: Asia in the Heart of Riyadh
- Nations: 45 (expected)
- Athletes: 4,500 (expected)
- Events: 122 in 18 sports
- Opening: 28 March 2027
- Closing: 8 April 2027

The 2026 Asian Indoor and Martial Arts Games, officially known as the 6th Asian Indoor and Martial Arts Games or simply Riyadh 2026, is scheduled to be a pan-Asian multi-sport event in indoor and martial arts sports hosted in Riyadh from 28 March to 8 April 2027. It will mark the first time that Saudi Arabia was scheduled to host an OCA event and preparation for the 2034 Asian Games.

Originally scheduled to take place from 28 November to 7 December 2026, the Games were postponed to 11 to 21 December 2026, then further to 28 March to 8 April 2027 due to 2026 Yemen offensives. The latter postponement was to ensure the alignment of schedules and operational arrangements and ensure the broadest possible participation from all participating nations.

== Bidding process ==
On 21 November 2021, the Olympic Council of Asia announced that Saudi Arabia will host the 2026 Asian Indoor and Martial Arts Games.

== Development and preparations ==
=== Venues ===
The athletes village will be at the Princess Nourah Bint Abdul Rahman University.

Venue		Events	Capacity
Boulevard City	Ceremonies Venue	Ceremonies	TBA
Boulevard City	Arena 1	Futsal	TBA
Boulevard City	Arena 1	Handball	TBA
Boulevard City	Arena 1	Mixed martial arts	TBA
Boulevard City	Arena 1	Weightlifting	TBA
Boulevard City	Arena 2	Boxing	TBA
Boulevard City	Arena 2	Muaythai	TBA
Boulevard City	Arena 3	3x3 basketball	TBA
Boulevard City	Arena 3	Teqball	TBA
Boulevard City	Arena 4	Squash	TBA
Boulevard City	Arena 5	Chess	TBA
Boulevard City	Arena 5	Cue sports	TBA
Boulevard City	Arena 6	Taekwondo	TBA
Boulevard City	Arena 6	Wrestling	TBA
Boulevard City	Arena 7	Judo	TBA
Boulevard City	Arena 7	Ju-jitsu	TBA
Boulevard City	Arena 7	Taekwondo	TBA

== The Games ==
=== Sports ===
- 3x3 basketball (2)
- Boxing (10)
- Chess (4)
- Cue sports (7)
- Futsal (2)
- Handball (2)
- Ju-jitsu (10)
- Judo (8)
- Karate (13)
- Kabaddi (2)
- Mixed martial arts (10)
- Muaythai (8)
- Padel (2)
- Squash (2)
- Taekwondo (15)
- Teqball (3)
- Weightlifting (8)
- Wrestling (14)

== Participating National Olympic Committees ==
All 45 National Olympic Committees who are members of the Olympic Council of Asia are expected to send delegations.

== See also ==
- 2026 Asian Games
- 2034 Asian Games

Preceded by Ashgabat	Asian Indoor and Martial Arts Games; Riyadh; VII Asian Indoor and Martial Arts Games (2026)	Succeeded by
