= United Arab Emirates at the 2007 Asian Winter Games =

- IOC code: UAE
- NOC: United Arab Emirates National Olympic Committee

in Changchun
- Competitors: 19

Asian Winter Games appearances
- 2007; 2011; 2017; 2025; 2029

United Arab Emirates participated in the 2007 Asian Winter Games held in Changchun, China from January 28, 2007 to February 4, 2007.
