= Ashgabat Indoor Tennis Arena =

Tennis complex in Ashgabat, Turkmenistan

Ashgabat indoor tennis arena
- Interactive map of Ashgabat indoor tennis arena
- Location: Ashgabat; Turkmenistan
- Coordinates: 37.907887°N 58.377367°E
- Capacity: 4,000 (tennis)
- Surface: Clay court

Construction
- Built: 2016
- Opened: 2016
- Architect: Polimeks

Tenant
- 2017 Asian Indoor and Martial Arts Games

The Ashgabat indoor tennis arena (Aşgabat tennis toplumy) is a tennis complex in Ashgabat, Turkmenistan. The complex is the host of the annual 2017 Asian Indoor and Martial Arts Games. The stadium court has a capacity of 4,000 people.

== General information ==
Indoor tennis arena includes 2 blocks. One of these blocks has a 42m x 24,5m hall and is designed for competitions and has permanent stands for 4,000 people. The other block has 4 training courts.

Near the indoor court, has 7 open tennis courts and 1 open court with tribune for 2,000 spectators.

== See also ==
- List of tennis stadiums by capacity
