= Football at the Asian Youth Games =

- Organiser(s): OCA; AFC
- Founded: 2009; 17 years ago
- Region: Asia
- Current champions: South Korea (2013)
- Most championships: South Korea (2 titles)

Boys' football tournament has been a regular Asian Youth Games sporting event since the first Asian Youth Games in 2009 edition, while girl's tournament not yet.

Age limit is under-14, same as the age limit in football competitions at the Youth Olympics. Although Kazakhstan is a member of the Olympic Council of Asia (OCA), the football team has been a member of the UEFA since 2002. The same rule applies to the Guam and Australia who are members of the AFC, but they are members of Oceania National Olympic Committees (ONOC).

South Korea is the only nation have won gold medals in Asian Youth Games.

== Results ==
=== Football ===
Year	Host	Final			Third Place
Year	Host	Gold Medal	Score	Silver Medal	Bronze Medal	Score	Fourth Place
2009 details	Singapore	South Korea	2–0	North Korea	Iran	2–0	China
2013 details	Nanjing, China	South Korea	1–0	Iran	North Korea	1–1 (5–4 pen.)	Iraq

=== Futsal ===
Futsal at the 2025 Asian Youth Games

Event	Gold	Silver	Bronze
Boys	Afghanistan; Ahmad Esmaeili; Habibullah Sultani; Amir Hamza Qassemi; Sayed Abulfazl Najafi; Ali Ahmadi; Wasay Bahadur; Mohammad Akbari; Abbas Heydari; Hussain Hassani; Mohammad Zia Rezaie; Naeem Rahmat Zada	Iran; Mohammad Ali Shekarchi; Mohammad Amin Safaei; Saeid Fakhrani; Abolfazl Zamani; Sadra Choupani; Hossein Reza Yousefi; Amir Hossein Mostasharnejad; Amir Hossein Abdolrazzaghi; Ali Ahmadi; Mohammad Javad Norouzi; Mohammad Hossein Gharibi; Mohammad Arshia Atef; Amir Hossein Dahipour; Mohammad Matin Karami	Thailand; Jenson Jacobs; Nattapong Potikornpat; Wachirawit Manoonphol; Teerapat Wongkrit; Tanapob Sunet; Jirawat Sangsom; Narawit Srisuwan; Thawin Thanjue; Achita Srijuy; Boonyarit Petchtiam; Ratthawit Sriraksa; Thanakorn Sasongkram; Punno Wangsilpakhun; Thanawat Phuwipadawat
Girls	Iran; Elina Mansouri; Niayesh Rahmani; Nafiseh Mohammadi; Ghazal Rahmani; Sarina Zare; Tannaz Bagheri; Hadis Yari; Fatemeh Abbasi; Setayesh Rezaei; Narges Amirmohseni; Zahra Amini; Fatemeh Shokrani; Aynaz Yazdipour; Elnaz Hosseinipour	China; Fu Xinyue; Ren Yunuo; Xu Xinyi; Ding Kejia; Zhang Lubi; Peng Yaqi; Pan Ziya; Chang Mengying; Zhao Zitong; Tong Wenjing; Zhang Yamingli; Wang Meijia; Lian Yutong; Huang Zixi	Chinese Taipei; Su Yun-ting; Shen Bei-dun; Shen Wun-jia; Wang Ping-en; Hou Yu-xuan; Huang Hsueh-fen; Wu Chih-chin; Huang Yu-jhen; Liang Pin-wei; Ku Hsuan; Fan Rou-tung; Lin Yu-xuan; Hsu Jung-chia; Yu Zi-xin

== Medal table ==
Rank	Nation	Gold	Silver	Bronze	Total
1	South Korea (KOR)	2	0	0	2
2	Iran (IRI)	1	2	1	4
3	Afghanistan (AFG)	1	0	0	1
4	North Korea (PRK)	0	1	1	2
5	China (CHN)	0	1	0	1
6	Chinese Taipei (TPE)	0	0	1	1
6	Thailand (THA)	0	0	1	1
Totals (7 entries)		4	4	4	12

== Medal ==
Team	1st place, gold medalist(s)	2nd place, silver medalist(s)	3rd place, bronze medalist(s)
South Korea	2 (2009, 2013)		
Iran		1 (2013)	1 (2009)
North Korea		1 (2009)	1 (2013)

== Participating nations ==
- P = Preliminary
- GS = Group Stage
- QF = Quarter Final
- 4th = Fourth Place
- 3rd = Bronze Medal
- 2nd = Silver Medal
- 1st = Gold Medal
- W = Withdrawn

Nation	(Singapore) 2009 (14)	(China) 2013 (16)	(Bahrain) 2025
China	4th	GS	
Chinese Taipei	P	GS	
Hong Kong	W	GS	
Indonesia		QF	
Iran	3rd	2nd	
Iraq		4th	
Kuwait		GS	
Laos	GS		
Malaysia	P		
Myanmar	P		
North Korea	2nd	3rd	
Pakistan	P	GS	
Philippines	W		
Qatar		GS	
Saudi Arabia	GS	GS	
Singapore	GS	GS	
South Korea	1st	1st	
Thailand	GS	QF	
Timor-Leste		QF	
Vietnam		QF	

== See also ==
- Football at the Asian Games
- Beach soccer at the Asian Beach Games
- Futsal at the Asian Indoor and Martial Arts Games
