= United Arab Emirates at the 2017 Asian Winter Games =

- IOC code: UAE
- NOC: United Arab Emirates National Olympic Committee

in Sapporo and Obihiro February 19–26
- Competitors: 24 in 2 sports
- Medals: Gold 0 Silver 0 Bronze 0 Total 0

Asian Winter Games appearances
- 2007; 2011; 2017; 2025; 2029

The United Arab Emirates is scheduled to compete in the 2017 Asian Winter Games in Sapporo and Obihiro, Japan from February 19 to 26. The country is scheduled to compete in two sports (figure skating and hockey).

== Competitors ==
The following table lists the Emirati delegation per sport and gender.

Sport	Men	Women	Total
Figure skating	0	1	1
Ice hockey	23	0	23
Total	23	1	24

== Figure skating ==
United Arab Emirates is scheduled to compete in the women's figure skating competition. This will mark the country's Asian Winter Games debut in the sport.

Athlete	Event	SP		FP		Total	
Athlete	Event	Points	Rank	Points	Rank	Points	Rank
Zahra Lari	Women's	23.31	19	53.37	18	76.68	18

== Ice hockey ==
The United Arab Emirates has entered a men's hockey team. The team will compete in division one. The United Arab Emirates finished in third place (7th place overall) in division 1 of the competition.

=== Men's tournament ===
United Arab Emirates was represented by the following 23 athletes:

- Faisal Al Suwaidi
- Hazaa Al Saadi
- Ahmed Al Suwaidi
- Said Al Amri
- Saeed Al Nuaimi
- Ahmed Atiq Al Dhaheri
- Faisal Al Blooshi
- Ali Mohamed Al Hadad
- Ayez Ahmad Al Muhairbi
- Mohamed Al Dhaheri
- Mohammad Saeed Al Junaibi
- Juma Al Dhaheri
- Omar Ali Al Shamisi
- Mohamed Saeed Al Shamisi
- Mohamed Hamad Al Dhaheri
- Suhail Al Mehairi
- Salim Al Yafei
- Obaid Al Al Muharrami
- Khalifa Al Mahrouqi
- Khalid Al Suwaidi
- Theyab Ali Al Sabousi
- Mohamed Al Zaabi
- Mohamed Rashid Al Kaabi

Legend: G = Goalie, D = Defense-man, F = Forward

Rank	Team	Pld	W	OW	OL	L	GF	GA	GD	Pts
5	Thailand	5	4	1	0	0	36	12	+24	14
6	Chinese Taipei	5	3	1	1	0	34	13	+21	12
7	United Arab Emirates	5	3	0	0	2	29	24	+5	9
8	Mongolia	5	2	0	0	3	25	23	+2	6
9	Hong Kong	5	1	0	1	3	27	27	0	4
10	Singapore	5	0	0	0	5	4	56	–52	0

18 February 2017; 15:30	Chinese Taipei	10–3 (4–1, 1–1, 5–1)	United Arab Emirates	Mikaho Gymnasium; Attendance: 290

Game reference
			Referee: (Japan) Hokkanen Kimmo; Linesmen: Juris Barcelo (Japan) Era Manabu
12 min	Penalties	22 min	Referee: (Japan) Hokkanen Kimmo; Linesmen: Juris Barcelo (Japan) Era Manabu
44	Shots	20	Referee: (Japan) Hokkanen Kimmo; Linesmen: Juris Barcelo (Japan) Era Manabu

20 February 2017; 12:00	United Arab Emirates	4–6 (0–1, 1–2, 3–3)	Thailand	Mikaho Gymnasium; Attendance: 450

Game reference
24 min	Penalties	6 min
19	Shots	52

21 February 2017; 19:00	United Arab Emirates	6–3 (3–0, 1–1, 2–2)	Mongolia	Mikaho Gymnasium; Attendance: 200

Game reference
16 min	Penalties	14 min
24	Shots	52

23 February 2017; 19:00	United Arab Emirates	11–2 (3–0, 3–1, 5–1)	Singapore	Mikaho Gymnasium; Attendance: 160

Game reference
4 min	Penalties	22 min
44	Shots	5

25 February 2017; 19:00	Hong Kong	3–5 (1–0, 1–2, 1–3)	United Arab Emirates	Mikaho Gymnasium; Attendance: 180

Game reference
10 min	Penalties	8 min
30	Shots	25
