= Julien Delaplane =

Tennis player

- Country (sports): New Caledonia; France
- Born: 18 February 1995 (age 30); New Caledonia
- Height: 5'10
- Plays: Right-handed
- Prize money: $2,070

Doubles
- Highest ranking: No. 1119 (27 July 2015)

Julien Delaplane (born February 18, 1995) is a New Caledonian tennis player. He won the Men's doubles, Men's teams gold medal, and men's singles silver medal at the 2015 Pacific Games. Two years later in the 2017 Pacific Mini Games he won gold in men’s singles after beating Cyril Jacobe 6-0 6-2. In the mixed doubles he got gold with teammate Samuelle Bull. In the men’s doubles he got third with teammate Maceo.
