= 3x3 basketball at the Asian Youth Games =

3x3 basketball at the Asian Youth Games may refer to:

- 3x3 basketball at the 2009 Asian Youth Games
- 3x3 basketball at the 2013 Asian Youth Games
- 3x3 basketball at the 2025 Asian Youth Games

== Medal table ==
Rank	Nation	Gold	Silver	Bronze	Total
1	China (CHN)	4	1	1	6
2	Chinese Taipei (TPE)	1	2	0	3
3	Japan (JPN)	1	0	0	1
4	Iran (IRI)	0	2	0	2
5	Bahrain (BRN)	0	1	0	1
6	South Korea (KOR)	0	0	3	3
7	Qatar (QAT)	0	0	1	1
7	Thailand (THA)	0	0	1	1
Totals (8 entries)		6	6	6	18
