= Asian Youth Games =

International multi-sport event

- 2009; 2013; 2025
- 3x3 basketball; Athletics; Badminton; Beach volleyball; Bowling; Diving; Fencing; Football; Golf; Handball; Judo; Rugby sevens; Sailing; Shooting; Squash; Table tennis; Taekwondo; Tennis; Weightlifting
- Olympic Council of Asia; NOCs

Asian Youth Games
- Abbreviation: AYG
- Frequency: Every 4-2 years
- Inaugurated: 2009 Asian Youth Games in Singapore
- Most recent: 2025 Asian Youth Games in Bahrain
- Next event: 2029 Asian Youth Games in Tashkent (Uzbekistan)

The Asian Youth Games, also known as AYG, is a multi-sport event held every four to two years among teenage athletes from all over Asia. The Games have been organized by the Olympic Council of Asia. The Games are described as the second-largest continental multi-sport event after the Asian Games.

The creation of the Asian Youth Games was a part of Singapore's bid to host the 2010 Summer Youth Olympics. It was intended to show Singapore's organisational capabilities and infrastructure.

In its history, three nations have hosted the Asian Youth Games. Forty-five nations have participated in the Games.

The last Games was held in Bahrain from 22 to 31 October 2025. The next Games will take place in 2029 in Tashkent, Uzbekistan.

== Editions ==
Host cities of the Asian Youth Games

Edition	Year	Host city	Host nation	Opened by	Start date	End date	Nations	Competitors	Sports	Events	Top-ranked team	Refs
I	2009	Singapore		Prime Minister Lee Hsien Loong	29 June	7 July	43	1,237	9	90	China (CHN)	
II	2013	Nanjing	China	Vice Premier Liu Yandong	16 August	24 August	45	2,404	16	122	China (CHN)	
—	~~2017~~	Originally awarded to Hambantota, then awarded to Jakarta, eventually cancelled due to no replacement host city found.										
—	~~2021~~	Originally awarded to Surabaya, then awarded to Shantou, eventually cancelled due to the COVID-19 pandemic.										
III	2025	Bahrain (Note: Originally awarded to Tashkent, Uzbekistan, which withdrew in December 2024 due to delays in infrastructure construction.)		Sheikh Nasser bin Hamad Al Khalifa	22 October	31 October	45	4,051	26	264	China (CHN)	
IV	2029	Tashkent (Note: Originally awarded to Phnom Penh, Cambodia, which withdrew in October 2025 due to organisers failing to meet contractual deadlines.)	Uzbekistan	Future event								
V	2033	Phnom Penh	Cambodia	Future event								

=== Future ===
After the Olympic Council of Asia proposed holding the Games biennially from 2029, the president of the Philippine Olympic Committee and executive board member of the Olympic Council of Asia, Abraham Tolentino, suggested that a future edition could be held in the Philippines, if the country's government were interested in supporting a bid.

== Sports ==
Sport	Years
3x3 basketball	All
Athletics	All
Badminton	Since 2013
Beach volleyball	2009
Boxing	2025
Camel racing	2025
Cycling	2025
Bowling	2009
Diving	2009 - 2013
Equestrian	2025
Esports	2025
Fencing	2013
Football	2009 - 2013
Futsal	2025
Golf	Since 2013
Handball	Since 2013
Judo	Since 2013
Ju-jitsu	2025

Sport	Years
Kabaddi	2025
Kurash	2025
Mixed martial arts	2025
Muaythai	2025
Pencak silat	2025
Rugby sevens	2013
Sailing	2009
Shooting	2009 - 2013
Squash	2013
Swimming	All
Table tennis	All
Taekwondo	Since 2013
Tennis	2013
Teqball	2025
Triathlon	2025
Volleyball	2025
Weightlifting	Since 2013
Wrestling	2025

== Medal table ==
As of the conclusion of the 2025 Asian Youth Games:

Rank	Nation	Gold	Silver	Bronze	Total
1	China	134	88	70	292
2	South Korea	52	37	42	131
3	Uzbekistan	38	18	36	92
4	Thailand	32	37	36	105
5	Kazakhstan	29	39	52	120
6	Iran	23	27	40	90
7	India	21	25	27	73
8	Hong Kong	20	26	28	74
9	Singapore	16	21	23	60
10	Japan	16	17	18	51
11	Chinese Taipei	14	22	44	80
12	North Korea	13	11	11	35
13	United Arab Emirates	12	9	10	31
14	Philippines	9	11	11	31
15	Vietnam	6	13	13	32
16	Saudi Arabia	6	5	15	26
17	Indonesia	5	8	21	34
18	Malaysia	5	8	17	30
19	Bahrain	5	5	5	15
20	Kuwait	5	4	6	15
21	Iraq	3	7	6	16
22	Qatar	2	6	1	9
23	Tajikistan	2	4	16	22
24	Jordan	2	2	12	16
25	Kyrgyzstan	1	9	12	22
26	Sri Lanka	1	3	12	16
27	Afghanistan	1	2	3	6
28	Turkmenistan	1	1	4	6
29	Yemen	1	0	3	4
30	Palestine	1	0	1	2
31	Syria	1	0	0	1
32	Mongolia	0	5	16	21
33	Cambodia	0	2	2	4
34	Pakistan	0	1	3	4
35	Macau	0	1	1	2
36	Lebanon	0	1	0	1
37	Bangladesh	0	0	2	2
37	Oman	0	0	2	2
39	Myanmar	0	0	1	1
Totals (39 entries)		477	475	622	1,574

== See also ==
- Youth Olympic Games
- African Youth Games
- European Youth Olympic Festival
- Junior Pan American Games
- Asian Youth Para Games
