= Vienna Kumar =

Fijian tennis player

- Full name: Vienna Kumar Fong
- Country (sports): Fiji
- Born: 14 July 2000 (age 24); Nadi, Fiji
- Plays: Junior tennis

Vienna Kumar (born 14 July 2000) is a Fijian tennis player. She competed at the 2017 Commonwealth Youth Games and the 2017 Asian Indoor and Martial Arts Games representing Fiji. Kumar also plays tennis and has partnered with fellow Fijian jr. tennis player Ruby Coffin in Women's doubles. Kumar was the first tennis player from Fiji to win the Girls Under-16 singles and doubles titles in the Margaret Court Cup and Victorian Grass Court Championships.

== Personal life ==
Kumar studied at the Natabua High School which is located in Lautoka.
