= List of Jordanian records in athletics =

The following are the national records in athletics in Jordan maintained by the Jordan Athletics Federation (JAF).

== Outdoor ==
Key to tables: Awaiting ratification Record not kept by JAF Not ratified or later rescinded by JAF

dh = downhill course

=== Men ===
Event	Record	Athlete	Date	Meet	Place	Ref.
100 m	10.43 (+1.2 m/s)	Zaid Al-Awamleh	18 June 2024	York University TFC Twilight 4	Toronto, Canada	
100 m	10.2 h	Muhammad Owaidah	14 November 1991		Amman, Jordan	
200 m	20.81 (+2.0 m/s)	Khalil Al-Hanahneh	24 November 2007	Pan Arab Games	Cairo, Egypt	
400 m	47.67	Abdelsalam Khalifa Al-Haj	25 July 2007		Amman, Jordan	
400 m	47.2 h	Shadi Qa'qour	11 September 1999		Irbid, Jordan	
800 m	1:48.25	Jihad Al-Balawi	15 July 1993	Universiade	Buffalo, United States	
1500 m	3:45.39	Bashar Al Kafraini	10 December 2006		Doha, Qatar	
1500 m	3:45.0 h	Jihad Al-Balawi	7 September 1992		Latakia, Syria	
3000 m	8:19.21	Bashar Ehayel Al-Kafraini	5 June 2004		Beirut, Lebanon	
5000 m	14:07.46	Awad Al-Hasini	16 October 1994	Asian Games	Hiroshima, Japan	
10,000 m	29:24.35	Awad Al-Hasini	10 October 1994	Asian Games	Hiroshima, Japan	
Half marathon	1:05:04 (Note: not recognized by World Athletics)	Awad Al-Hasini	12 April 1992		Nice, France	
Half marathon	1:05:57	Methkal Abu Drais	15 October 2010		Aleppo, Syria	
Marathon	2:17:24	Methkal Abu Drais	25 January 2015	Marrakech Marathon	Marrakesh, Morocco	
110 m hurdles	14.78	Nerysqla Maam	26 September 2009		Amman, Jordan	
110 m hurdles	14.2 h	Ra'e Khraisat	29 July 2000		Irbid, Jordan	
400 m hurdles	53.62	Hassan Abou Najem	27 September 1993		Latakia, Syria	
400 m hurdles	53.2 h	Hassan Abou Najem	6 September 1992		Syria	
3000 m steeplechase	8:40.74	Jihad Al-Balawi	7 July 1990		Lübeck, West Germany	
High jump	2.22 m	Fakhredin Fouad	4 July 1991		Amman, Jordan	
Pole vault	4.91 m	Taher Salom Al-Zahoun	20 March 2010		Irbid, Jordan	
Long jump	7.48 m (−0.3 m/s)	Khalil Al-Hanahneh	26 April 2008		Amman, Jordan	
Long jump	7.48 m (+0.6 m/s)	Khalil Al-Hanahneh	19 March 2010		Irbid, Jordan	
Triple jump	15.87 m	Mohamed Abdul Baqi	29 July 2000		Irbid, Jordan	
Shot put	18.41 m	Musab Al-Momani	21 May 2013	Arab Championships	Doha, Qatar	
Discus throw	62.64 m	Musab Al-Momani	11 October 2012		Amman, Jordan	
Hammer throw	57.36 m	Ahmed Amer Hawaftnah	26 April 2017		Doha, Qatar	
Javelin throw	58.48 m	Khaled Jaber	8 June 1995		Irbid, Jordan	
Decathlon	6586 pts	Hassan Abou Najem	13–14 August 1999		Irbid, Jordan	
Decathlon	100m / Long jump / Shot put / High jump / 400m / 110m H / Discus / Pole vault / Javelin / 1500m; 11.28 / 6.54 m / 11.72 m / 1.83 m / 48.98 / 15.69 / 29.29 m / 3.20 m / 48.35 m / 4:23.53					
10,000 m walk (track)	47:40.1 h	Rice Daua	20 September 1991		Amman, Jordan	
20 km walk (road)	1:40:53	Muein Taa Al-Khalaf	2 September 1995	Universiade	Fukuoka, Japan	
50 km walk (road)						
4 × 100 m relay	41.9 h	Jordan; S. Abdelbaki; Mohamad Shaman; Mohamed Aouida; Hassan Abou Najem	10 May 1994		Baghdad, Iraq	
4 × 400 m relay	3:14.3 h	Jordan; Mohamad Shaman; Jihad Al-Balawi; Hassan Abou Najem; A. Al-Safi	5 October 1989		Cairo, Egypt	

=== Women ===
Event	Record	Athlete	Date	Meet	Place	Ref.
100 m	11.97 (+0.1 m/s)	Basma Al-Eshoush	6 October 2004	Pan Arab Games	Algiers, Algeria	
100 m	11.97 NWI	Aliya Boshnak	28 June 2016		Amman, Jordan	
200 m	24.64 NWI	Aliya Boshnak	22 April 2018		Amman, Jordan	
400 m	55.38	Aliya Boshnak	12 July 2017	World Youth Championships	Nairobi, Kenya	
800 m	2:10.01	Tamara Armoush	23 July 2016	Oxford Grand Prix	Oxford, United Kingdom	
1500 m	4:18.25	Tamara Armoush	24 June 2017	BMC Grand Prix	Watford, United Kingdom	
3000 m	9:36.28	Tamara Armoush	4 June 2016	UK Women's League Premier Division Match #1	Swansea, United Kingdom	
5000 m	17:44.8 h	Amal Al-Matari	23 April 1997		Baghdad, Iraq	
5000 m	18:12.00	Amal Al-Matari	26 May 1995		Egypt	
5 km (road)	18:29+	Tamara Armoush	28 April 2019	London Marathon	London, United Kingdom	
10,000 m	34:00.81	Tamara Armoush	19 May 2018	Highgate Harriers Night	London, United Kingdom	
10 km (road)	34:47	Tamara Armoush	5 March 2017		Manchester, United Kingdom	
15 km (road)	56:20+	Tamara Armoush	28 April 2019	London Marathon	London, United Kingdom	
20 km (road)	1:15:33+	Tamara Armoush	28 April 2019	London Marathon	London, United Kingdom	
Half marathon	1:29:02 h	Amal Al-Matari	13 July 1997		Beirut, Lebanon	
Half marathon	1:26:12 dh	Safaa Nemer	3 April 2015		Amman, Jordan	
Half marathon	1:19:41+	Tamara Armoush	28 April 2019	London Marathon	London, United Kingdom	
25 km (road)	1:34:45+	Tamara Armoush	28 April 2019	London Marathon	London, United Kingdom	
30 km (road)	1:55:16+	Tamara Armoush	28 April 2019	London Marathon	London, United Kingdom	
Marathon	2:56:39	Tamara Armoush	28 April 2019	London Marathon	London, United Kingdom	
100 m hurdles	14.49 (+2.0 m/s)	Basma Al-Eshoush	7 October 2004	Pan Arab Games	Algiers, Algeria	
400 m hurdles	1:01.72	Aliya Boshnak	24 April 2026	Laniteia Open Meeting and Pancyprian University Championships	Limassol, Cyrpus	
3000 m steeplechase	11:15.97	Pvik Elaa	20 March 2010		Debra, Bangladesh	
High jump	1.63 m	Samya Matouk	18 September 1994		Irbid, Jordan	
High jump	1.73 m (Note: per IAAF Statistic Handbook 2017; probably annulled. Souhad Hadad was a transgender athlete whom was later disqualified and stripped of all medals and records because she provided falsified paperwork to qualify for women's events)	Souhad Hadad	26 August 1993		Irbid, Jordan	
Pole vault	3.10 m	Basma Al-Eshoush	4 October 2004	Pan Arab Games	Algiers, Algeria	
Pole vault	3.20 m	Fatima Al-Zahraa	12 September 2004		Damascus, Syria	
Long jump	6.01 m (+0.5 m/s)	Rima Farid Taha	18 May 2007		Amman, Jordan	
Triple jump	12.60 m (±0.0 m/s)	Rima Farid Taha	29 October 2011	Pan Arab Games	Al Ain, United Arab Emirates	
Shot put	17.83 m	Nada Mufid Kawar	6 May 2000		Los Angeles, United States	
Discus throw	60.11 m	Nada Mufid Kawar	28 March 1998		La Jolla, United States	
Hammer throw	44.66 m	Nada Mufid Kawar	16 March 1996		Los Angeles, United States	
Javelin throw	38.28 m	Fatin Bakhit	23 November 2000		Baghdad, Iraq	
Heptathlon	4263 pts	Rania Shoukri Al-Qebali	5–6 May 2010		Cairo, Egypt	
Heptathlon	100m H / High jump / Shot put / 200m / Long jump / Javelin / 800m; 15.61 / 1.55 m / 8.35 m / 25.85 / 5.03 m / 20.91 m / 2:28.10					
20 km walk (road)						
50 km walk (road)						
4 × 100 m relay	50.4 h	Jordan; Imtithal Da’abes; Alia Al-Matari; M. Jalal; Intisar Othman	23 July 1987		Damascus, Syria	
4 × 400 m relay	4:01.28	Jordan; Imtithal Da’abes; Montaha Al-Majali; Alia Al-Matari; Souhad Haddad	10 September 1992		Latakia, Syria	

=== Mixed ===
Event	Record	Athlete	Date	Meet	Place	Ref.
4 × 400 m relay	4:00.52	Jordan; H. Hammoud; Bilal Thiab; Y. Al-Khatib; A. Al-Sharafat	26 April 2023	West Asian Championships	Doha, Qatar	

== Indoor ==
=== Men ===
Event	Record	Athlete	Date	Meet	Place	Ref.
60 m	6.84	Bilal Thiyab	17 February 2024	Turkish Championships	Istanbul, Turkey	
200 m						
400 m	49.01	Abdelrahman Abualhummos	18 September 2017	Asian Indoor and Martial Arts Games	Ashgabat, Turkmenistan	
800 m	1:53.47	Bashar Mahmoud Alkufrini	19 September 2017	Asian Indoor and Martial Arts Games	Ashgabat, Turkmenistan	
1500 m	3:53.65	Awwad Mohammad Al-Sharafat	20 September 2017	Asian Indoor and Martial Arts Games	Ashgabat, Turkmenistan	
3000 m	8:37.56	Ahmad Smour	18 September 2017	Asian Indoor and Martial Arts Games	Ashgabat, Turkmenistan	
60 m hurdles	8.01	Zaid Al-Awamleh	23 February 2024	Ontario University Championships	Windsor, Canada	
High jump	2.05 m	Mohammad Jamal Al-Buheiri	2 February 2019		Toruń, Poland	
Pole vault						
Long jump	7.17 m	Khalil Al-Hanahneh	10 February 2006	Asian Championships	Pattaya, Thailand	
Triple jump	13.80 m	Ahmad Walid Ahmad Younis	20 September 2017	Asian Indoor and Martial Arts Games	Ashgabat, Turkmenistan	
Shot put	15.81 m	Musab Ibrahim Momani	18 September 2017	Asian Indoor and Martial Arts Games	Ashgabat, Turkmenistan	
Heptathlon						
Heptathlon	60m / Long jump / Shot put / High jump / 60m H / Pole vault / 1000m					
5000 m walk						
4 × 400 m relay						

=== Women ===
Event	Record	Athlete	Date	Meet	Place	Ref.
60 m	7.89	Aliya Boshnak	7 December 2019	Yale Season Opener	New Haven, United States	
200 m	24.31	Amal Haddad	23 January 1999		Houston, United States	
400 m	56.46	Aliya Boshnak	15 February 2020 (Note: by World Athletics statistic handbook, 14 February 2020 by World Athletics Athlete Profile)	BU David Hemery Valentine Invitational	Boston, United States	
500 m	1:19.45	Aliya Boshnak	18 January 2019	Dartmouth vs. Columbiy vs. Yale	New York City, United States	
800 m	2:29.23	Rania Shoukri Al-Qabali	14 February 2008	Asian Championships	Doha, Qatar	
1500 m	4:37.61	Tamara Armoush	18 March 2016	World Championships	Portland, United States	
3000 m	9:27.68	Tamara Armoush	11 February 2017		Sheffield, United Kingdom	
60 m hurdles	10.47	Shifa Anabtawi	10 February 2006	Asian Championships	Pattaya, Thailand	
60 m hurdles	9.8 h	Rania Shoukri Al-Qabali	14 February 2008	Asian Championships	Doha, Qatar	
High jump	1.43 m	Rania Shoukri Al-Qabali	14 February 2008	Asian Championships	Doha, Qatar	
Pole vault						
Long jump	5.85 m	Rima Taha Farid	11 February 2006	Asian Championships	Pattaya, Thailand	
Triple jump						
Shot put	17.74 m A	Nada Kawar	12 February 1999		Colorado Springs, United States	
Pentathlon	2426 pts	Rania Shoukri Al-Qabali	14 February 2008	Asian Championships	Doha, Qatar	
Pentathlon	60m H / High jump / Shot put / Long jump / 800m; 9.8 h / 1.43 m / NM / 4.68 m / 2:29.23					
3000 m walk						
4 × 400 m relay	4:10.55	Jordan; Farah Hashem; Sabrieh Maradat; Aliya Boshnak; Noor Al-Qadi	21 February 2016	Asian Championships	Doha, Qatar	
