= Taekwondo at the 2017 Asian Indoor and Martial Arts Games =

Taekwondo competition

- Venue: Ashgabat Taekwondo and Dancesport Arena
- Dates: 18–22 September 2017

Taekwondo was contested at the 2017 Asian Indoor and Martial Arts Games 18–22 September 2017. The competition took place at Taekwondo Arena in Ashgabat, Turkmenistan.

== Medalists ==
=== Poomsae ===
Event	Gold	Silver	Bronze
Men's individual	Pongporn Suvittayarak; Thailand	Rodolfo Reyes; Philippines	Zhu Yuxiang; China
Men's individual	Pongporn Suvittayarak; Thailand	Rodolfo Reyes; Philippines	Kourosh Bakhtiar; Iran
Men's team	Indonesia; Maulana Haidir; Abdurrahman Wahyu; Muhammad Alfi Kusuma	Iran; Kourosh Bakhtiar; Mohammad Sadegh Fotouhi; Ali Sohrabi	Philippines; Rodolfo Reyes; Dustin Mella; Raphael Mella
Men's team	Indonesia; Maulana Haidir; Abdurrahman Wahyu; Muhammad Alfi Kusuma	Iran; Kourosh Bakhtiar; Mohammad Sadegh Fotouhi; Ali Sohrabi	China; Zhu Yuxiang; Hu Mingda; Deng Tingfeng
Women's individual	Marjan Salahshouri; Iran	Jocel Lyn Ninobla; Philippines	Nguyễn Thị Lê Kim; Vietnam
Women's individual	Marjan Salahshouri; Iran	Jocel Lyn Ninobla; Philippines	Defia Rosmaniar; Indonesia
Women's team	Vietnam; Châu Tuyết Vân; Nguyễn Thị Lê Kim; Liên Thị Tuyết Mai	Indonesia; Defia Rosmaniar; Mutiara Habiba; Ruhil	Iran; Marjan Salahshouri; Narges Minakhani; Mahsa Sadeghi
Women's team	Vietnam; Châu Tuyết Vân; Nguyễn Thị Lê Kim; Liên Thị Tuyết Mai	Indonesia; Defia Rosmaniar; Mutiara Habiba; Ruhil	Philippines; Jocel Lyn Ninobla; Juvenile Crisostomo; Rinna Babanto

=== Men's kyorugi ===
Event	Gold	Silver	Bronze
Finweight −54 kg	Mehdi Eshaghi; Iran	Manuchehr Nematov; Tajikistan	Valentin Khegay; Uzbekistan
Finweight −54 kg	Mehdi Eshaghi; Iran	Manuchehr Nematov; Tajikistan	Aituar Shaikenov; Kazakhstan
Flyweight −58 kg	Jang Jun; South Korea	Hadi Tiran; Iran	Jin Agojo; Philippines
Flyweight −58 kg	Jang Jun; South Korea	Hadi Tiran; Iran	Niyaz Pulatov; Uzbekistan
Bantamweight −63 kg	Soroush Ahmadi; Iran	Nutthawee Klompong; Thailand	Nguyễn Văn Duy; Vietnam
Bantamweight −63 kg	Soroush Ahmadi; Iran	Nutthawee Klompong; Thailand	Ho Chia-hsin; Chinese Taipei
Featherweight −68 kg	Seo Kang-eun; South Korea	Rozaimi Rozali; Malaysia	Saud Al-Muwallad; Saudi Arabia
Featherweight −68 kg	Seo Kang-eun; South Korea	Rozaimi Rozali; Malaysia	Shukhrat Salaev; Uzbekistan
Lightweight −74 kg	Mehdi Jalali; Iran	Kairat Sarymsakov; Kazakhstan	Anas Al-Adarbi; Jordan
Lightweight −74 kg	Mehdi Jalali; Iran	Kairat Sarymsakov; Kazakhstan	Ren Ke; China
Welterweight −80 kg	Erfan Nazemi; Iran	Chen Linglong; China	Ali Al-Araimi; Qatar
Welterweight −80 kg	Erfan Nazemi; Iran	Chen Linglong; China	Saleh El-Sharabaty; Jordan
Middleweight −87 kg	Saeid Rajabi; Iran	Liu Jintao; China	Bae Il-gyu; South Korea
Middleweight −87 kg	Saeid Rajabi; Iran	Liu Jintao; China	Kristopher Uy; Philippines

=== Women's kyorugi ===
Event	Gold	Silver	Bronze
Finweight −46 kg	Tan Xueqin; China	Han Na-yeon; South Korea	Fatemeh Maddahi; Iran
Finweight −46 kg	Tan Xueqin; China	Han Na-yeon; South Korea	Dhean Titania Fajrin; Indonesia
Flyweight −49 kg	Hung Yu-ting; Chinese Taipei	Kim Ji-hea; South Korea	Bana Daraghmi; Jordan
Flyweight −49 kg	Hung Yu-ting; Chinese Taipei	Kim Ji-hea; South Korea	Keshena Waterford; Australia
Bantamweight −53 kg	Woo Ha-young; South Korea	Phannapa Harnsujin; Thailand	Dinorahon Mamadibragimova; Uzbekistan
Bantamweight −53 kg	Woo Ha-young; South Korea	Phannapa Harnsujin; Thailand	Mariska Halinda; Indonesia
Featherweight −57 kg	Chen Yu-chuang; Chinese Taipei	Zhou Lijun; China	Tayyebeh Parsa; Iran
Featherweight −57 kg	Chen Yu-chuang; Chinese Taipei	Zhou Lijun; China	Trần Thị Ánh Tuyết; Vietnam
Lightweight −62 kg	Parisa Javadi; Iran	Zhang Mengyu; China	Hà Thị Nguyên; Vietnam
Lightweight −62 kg	Parisa Javadi; Iran	Zhang Mengyu; China	Thanapa Saelao; Thailand
Welterweight −67 kg	Gao Pan; China	Chen Yann-yeu; Chinese Taipei	Ruth Hock; Australia
Welterweight −67 kg	Gao Pan; China	Chen Yann-yeu; Chinese Taipei	Julyana Al-Sadeq; Jordan
Middleweight −73 kg	Myeong Mi-na; South Korea	Svetlana Osipova; Uzbekistan	Kirstie Alora; Philippines
Middleweight −73 kg	Myeong Mi-na; South Korea	Svetlana Osipova; Uzbekistan	Ma Ting-hsia; Chinese Taipei

== Medal table ==
Rank	Nation	Gold	Silver	Bronze	Total
1	Iran (IRI)	7	2	4	13
2	South Korea (KOR)	4	2	1	7
3	China (CHN)	2	4	3	9
4	Chinese Taipei (TPE)	2	1	2	5
5	Thailand (THA)	1	2	1	4
6	Indonesia (INA)	1	1	3	5
7	Vietnam (VIE)	1	0	4	5
8	Philippines (PHI)	0	2	5	7
9	Uzbekistan (UZB)	0	1	4	5
10	Kazakhstan (KAZ)	0	1	1	2
11	Malaysia (MAS)	0	1	0	1
11	Tajikistan (TJK)	0	1	0	1
13	Jordan (JOR)	0	0	4	4
14	Australia (AUS)	0	0	2	2
15	Qatar (QAT)	0	0	1	1
15	Saudi Arabia (KSA)	0	0	1	1
Totals (16 entries)		18	18	36	72

== Results ==
=== Poomsae ===
==== Men's individual ====
22 September

Rank	Athlete	SF	Final
1st place, gold medalist(s)	Pongporn Suvittayarak (THA)	8.05	8.55
2nd place, silver medalist(s)	Rodolfo Reyes (PHI)	7.96	8.31
3rd place, bronze medalist(s)	Zhu Yuxiang (CHN)	7.89	8.25
3rd place, bronze medalist(s)	Kourosh Bakhtiar (IRI)	8.00	8.23
5	Ali Sohrabi (IRI)	7.72	8.17
6	Dustin Mella (PHI)	7.88	8.17
7	Maulana Haidir (INA)	7.91	8.15
8	Lê Hiếu Nghĩa (VIE)	7.76	8.07
9	Muhammad Alfi Kusuma (INA)	7.65	
10	Hồ Thanh Phong (VIE)	7.58	
11	Choy Cheuk Yin (HKG)	7.56	
12	Chan Wing Ho (HKG)	7.55	
13	Ho Chi Tong (MAC)	7.40	
14	Sardar Agha Amiri (AFG)	7.03	
15	Ehsan Ashraf (PAK)	6.33	
16	Tenzin Dorji (BHU)	5.56	
17	Rahul Anilkumar Jain (IND)	DNS	

==== Men's team ====
22 September

Rank	Team	Score
1st place, gold medalist(s)	Indonesia (INA)	8.39
2nd place, silver medalist(s)	Iran (IRI)	8.38
3rd place, bronze medalist(s)	Philippines (PHI)	8.31
3rd place, bronze medalist(s)	China (CHN)	8.24
5	Vietnam (VIE)	8.19
6	Afghanistan (AFG)	7.45
7	India (IND)	DNS

==== Women's individual ====
22 September

Rank	Athlete	SF	Final
1st place, gold medalist(s)	Marjan Salahshouri (IRI)	7.76	8.12
2nd place, silver medalist(s)	Jocel Lyn Ninobla (PHI)	7.71	8.00
3rd place, bronze medalist(s)	Nguyễn Thị Lê Kim (VIE)	7.64	7.98
3rd place, bronze medalist(s)	Defia Rosmaniar (INA)	7.65	7.97
5	Katesara Kiatatchawachai (THA)	7.62	7.96
6	Châu Tuyết Vân (VIE)	7.82	7.95
7	Narges Minakhani (IRI)	7.71	7.90
8	Rinna Babanto (PHI)	7.58	7.87
9	Wei Mengyue (CHN)	7.57	
10	Mutiara Habiba (INA)	7.57	
11	Wong Ka Yiu (HKG)	7.38	
12	Cheung Kar Yue (HKG)	7.35	
13	Loi Leong San (MAC)	7.14	
14	Lam Hio Tong (MAC)	6.76	
15	Sophia Nayab Baig (PAK)	6.49	
16	Jangchub Choden (BHU)	6.02	
17	Harsha Singha (IND)	DNS	

==== Women's team ====
22 September

Rank	Team	Score
1st place, gold medalist(s)	Vietnam (VIE)	8.05
2nd place, silver medalist(s)	Indonesia (INA)	8.03
3rd place, bronze medalist(s)	Iran (IRI)	7.98
3rd place, bronze medalist(s)	Philippines (PHI)	7.96
5	China (CHN)	7.89
6	India (IND)	DNS

=== Men's kyorugi ===
==== 54 kg ====
18 September

Round of 32
Anura Tikiri Bandage (SRI)	17–21	Işanberdi Gulamow (TKM)
Chan Chon In (MAC)	12–22 PUN	Serdar Gurtgeldiýew (TKM)
Tenzin Dorji (BHU)	17–9	Ian Tasso (VAN)
Bilal Zazai (AFG)	DQ	Waheedullah Yousufzai (AFG)
Iskender Osmonov (KGZ)	DQ	Ninad Pachange (IND)
Moath Al-Qatawneh (JOR)	16–24	Ha So-mang (KOR)

Round of 16
Mehdi Eshaghi (IRI)	23
Işanberdi Gulamow (TKM)	3
Ali Kamil (IRQ)	11
Marstio Embrian Hidayatullah (INA)	27
Purim Purinthrapiban (THA)	21
Chan Chon In (MAC)	3
Tenzin Dorji (BHU)	6
Valentin Khegay (UZB)	19
Fahad Al-Samih (KSA)	19
Bilal Zazai (AFG)	20
Iskender Osmonov (KGZ)
Aituar Shaikenov (KAZ)	RSC
Ouyang Xiongbin (CHN)	11
Manuchehr Nematov (TJK)	13
Ha So-mang (KOR)	15
Jenar Torillos (PHI)	19

Quarterfinals
Mehdi Eshaghi (IRI)	23
Marstio Embrian Hidayatullah (INA)	2
Purim Purinthrapiban (THA)	11
Valentin Khegay (UZB)	22
Bilal Zazai (AFG)	16
Aituar Shaikenov (KAZ)	19
Manuchehr Nematov (TJK)	14
Jenar Torillos (PHI)	12

Semifinals
Mehdi Eshaghi (IRI)	11
Valentin Khegay (UZB)	7
Aituar Shaikenov (KAZ)	12
Manuchehr Nematov (TJK)	14

Final
Mehdi Eshaghi (IRI)	23
Manuchehr Nematov (TJK)	5

==== 58 kg ====
20 September

Round of 32
Sangay Wangchuk (BHU)	12–26 PUN	Ng Chi Hou (MAC)
Shivam Sudesh Shetty (IND)	DQ	Leon Ho (GUM)
Roslan Lbzo (JOR)	WD	Sione Tufi (TGA)

Round of 16
Jin Agojo (PHI)	35
Ng Chi Hou (MAC)	6
Võ Quốc Hưng (VIE)	32
Muhammet Rozyýew (TKM)	20
Mohsen Rezaee (AFG)	27
Yazan Abuzaideh (PLE)	1
Jang Jun (KOR)	19
Mahmood Haidari (AFG)	3
Niyaz Pulatov (UZB)	22
Leon Ho (GUM)	2
Dzhamshed Nasyrov (TJK)	11
Wu Yichao (CHN)	14
Inthat Ratanawangjaroen (THA)	18
Aleksandr Kuwarzin (TKM)	14
Roslan Lbzo (JOR)	10
Hadi Tiran (IRI)	12

Quarterfinals
Jin Agojo (PHI)	29
Võ Quốc Hưng (VIE)	26
Mohsen Rezaee (AFG)	17
Jang Jun (KOR)	35^{P}
Niyaz Pulatov (UZB)	17
Wu Yichao (CHN)	5
Inthat Ratanawangjaroen (THA)	16
Hadi Tiran (IRI)	18

Semifinals
Jin Agojo (PHI)	12
Jang Jun (KOR)	37
Niyaz Pulatov (UZB)	12
Hadi Tiran (IRI)	13

Final
Jang Jun (KOR)	31^{P}
Hadi Tiran (IRI)	10

==== 63 kg ====
19 September

Round of 32
Xiao Chenming (CHN)	25–20	Nurmyrat Berkeliýew (TKM)
Dorji Khando (BHU)	1–24	Nguyễn Văn Duy (VIE)
Davlatmurod Karimov (TJK)	15–12	Bir Bahadur Mahara (NEP)
Noh Woo-seok (KOR)	30–2	Şanepes Hudaýberdiýew (TKM)
Chaerul Adzan (INA)	20–5	Teddy Teng (TAH)
Saravana Kumar (IND)	DQ	Jaafar Jabbar (IRQ)

Round of 16
Nutthawee Klompong (THA)	RSC
Xiao Chenming (CHN)
Ahmad Ali Bakhshi (AFG)	5
Joaquin Mendoza (PHI)	4
Will Afonczenko (AUS)	5
Nguyễn Văn Duy (VIE)	22
Davlatmurod Karimov (TJK)	11
Kazybek Baktiyaruly (KAZ)	9
Ho Chia-hsin (TPE)	23
Noh Woo-seok (KOR)	21
Chaerul Adzan (INA)	8
Kamronbek Yakhshiboev (UZB)	29
Hikmatullah Zain (AFG)	20
Joe Ho (GUM)	10
Jaafar Jabbar (IRQ)	7
Soroush Ahmadi (IRI)	24

Quarterfinals
Nutthawee Klompong (THA)	22
Ahmad Ali Bakhshi (AFG)	10
Nguyễn Văn Duy (VIE)	21
Davlatmurod Karimov (TJK)	7
Ho Chia-hsin (TPE)	29
Kamronbek Yakhshiboev (UZB)	20
Hikmatullah Zain (AFG)	9
Soroush Ahmadi (IRI)	24

Semifinals
Nutthawee Klompong (THA)	28
Nguyễn Văn Duy (VIE)	8
Ho Chia-hsin (TPE)	4
Soroush Ahmadi (IRI)	18

Final
Nutthawee Klompong (THA)	7
Soroush Ahmadi (IRI)	10

==== 68 kg ====
21 September

Round of 32
Serdar Çaryýew (TKM)	23–37	Chalinda Liyanage (SRI)
Jelaletdin Batyrow (TKM)	17–21	Khurram Mehtarshoev (TJK)
Luke Uhi (TGA)	9–39	Jigme Wangchuk (BHU)
Chu Kai Ching (HKG)	7–20	Hafizullah Safari (AFG)
Shukhrat Salaev (UZB)	42–6	Freddy Saksak (VAN)
Seo Kang-eun (KOR)	25–2	Arsalan Asad Khan (PAK)
Hussein Raheem (IRQ)	6–5	Sirawit Piyajinda (THA)

Round of 16
Saud Al-Muwallad (KSA)	25
Chalinda Liyanage (SRI)	4
Sharif Muradi (AFG)	29
Muhammad Iqbal (PAK)	10
Lý Hồng Phúc (VIE)	19
Khurram Mehtarshoev (TJK)	12
Jigme Wangchuk (BHU)	11
Rozaimi Rozali (MAS)	37
Song Guodong (CHN)	23
Hafizullah Safari (AFG)	3
Shukhrat Salaev (UZB)	RSC
Mohammad Salar Vahidi (IRI)
Chandan Lakra (IND)
Seo Kang-eun (KOR)	DQ
Hussein Raheem (IRQ)	4
Arven Alcantara (PHI)	26

Quarterfinals
Saud Al-Muwallad (KSA)	13
Sharif Muradi (AFG)	7
Lý Hồng Phúc (VIE)	15
Rozaimi Rozali (MAS)	19
Song Guodong (CHN)	13
Shukhrat Salaev (UZB)	17
Seo Kang-eun (KOR)	26
Arven Alcantara (PHI)	18

Semifinals
Saud Al-Muwallad (KSA)	8
Rozaimi Rozali (MAS)	10
Shukhrat Salaev (UZB)	11
Seo Kang-eun (KOR)	19

Final
Rozaimi Rozali (MAS)	6
Seo Kang-eun (KOR)	21^{P}

==== 74 kg ====
18 September

Round of 32
Shakhboz Shofayziev (UZB)	18–19	Peeraphat Jaratsri (THA)
Akbar Aitakhunov (KGZ)	DQ	Sioota Makolo Pole (TUV)
Abdullah Al-Ghunmeen (JOR)	23–3	Tilak Bahadur Gurung (BHU)
Mohammed Jabbar (IRQ)	17–17 PUN	Rzaguly Toýmyradow (TKM)
Peter Babka (TAH)	24–12	Polat Baýramow (TKM)
Sonexay Mangkheua (LAO)	22–19	Hamidullah Niazi (AFG)
Kim Jae-rang (KOR)	4–24	Ren Ke (CHN)
Alexander Allen (GUM)	DQ	Manu George (IND)

Round of 16
Kairat Sarymsakov (KAZ)	8
Peeraphat Jaratsri (THA)	2
Akbar Aitakhunov (KGZ)	19
Muhammad Faheem (PAK)	2
Mohammed Hamooda (QAT)	22
Abdullah Al-Ghunmeen (JOR)	9
Rzaguly Toýmyradow (TKM)	3
Anas Al-Adarbi (JOR)	24
Samuel Morrison (PHI)	34
Peter Babka (TAH)	12
Sonexay Mangkheua (LAO)	1
Mehdi Jalali (IRI)	22
Majed Al-Mabruk (KSA)
Ren Ke (CHN)	DQ
Alexander Allen (GUM)	6
Yang Tsung-yeh (TPE)	18

Quarterfinals
Kairat Sarymsakov (KAZ)	8
Akbar Aitakhunov (KGZ)	2
Mohammed Hamooda (QAT)	8
Anas Al-Adarbi (JOR)	11
Samuel Morrison (PHI)	15
Mehdi Jalali (IRI)	26
Ren Ke (CHN)	23
Yang Tsung-yeh (TPE)	20

Semifinals
Kairat Sarymsakov (KAZ)	4
Anas Al-Adarbi (JOR)	3
Mehdi Jalali (IRI)	21
Ren Ke (CHN)	13

Final
Kairat Sarymsakov (KAZ)	2
Mehdi Jalali (IRI)	5

==== 80 kg ====
20 September

Round of 16
Erfan Nazemi (IRI)	25
Kafayatullah Gheiase (AFG)	6
Ali Al-Araimi (QAT)	17
Remuela Tinirau (TAH)	12
Kim Se-young (KOR)	23
Cameron Taylor (AUS)	8
Saleh El-Sharabaty (JOR)	12
Ramesh Hussaini (AFG)	7
Ýusup Annaýew (TKM)	DQ
Navjeet Maan (IND)
Chen Linglong (CHN)	28
Sonam Wangchuk (BHU)	0
Tenzin Lhendup (BHU)	5
Christian dela Cruz (PHI)	17^{P}

Quarterfinals
Nurlan Myrzabayev (KAZ)	15
Erfan Nazemi (IRI)	16
Ali Al-Araimi (QAT)	17
Kim Se-young (KOR)	14
Saleh El-Sharabaty (JOR)	27
Ýusup Annaýew (TKM)	6
Chen Linglong (CHN)	17
Christian dela Cruz (PHI)	8

Semifinals
Erfan Nazemi (IRI)	28
Ali Al-Araimi (QAT)	15
Saleh El-Sharabaty (JOR)	10
Chen Linglong (CHN)	15

Final
Erfan Nazemi (IRI)	13
Chen Linglong (CHN)	12

==== 87 kg ====
19 September

Round of 16
Adam Meyers (AUS)	DQ
Nakul Malhotra (IND)
Hao Chao (MAC)	30
Serdar Annagylyjow (TKM)	8
Bae Il-gyu (KOR)	22
Anas Sadek (JOR)	20
Liu Jintao (CHN)	24
Adil Shah (PAK)	0
Waldeck Defaix (TAH)	22
Mirzonozim Sharapov (UZB)	16
Kristopher Uy (PHI)	20
Abdul Wali Alif (AFG)	9

Quarterfinals
Saeid Rajabi (IRI)	24
Adam Meyers (AUS)	4
Hao Chao (MAC)	9
Bae Il-gyu (KOR)	29
Liu Jintao (CHN)	8
Waldeck Defaix (TAH)	0
Kristopher Uy (PHI)	11
Lo Chih-chun (TPE)	5

Semifinals
Saeid Rajabi (IRI)	33
Bae Il-gyu (KOR)	5
Liu Jintao (CHN)	27
Kristopher Uy (PHI)	10

Final
Saeid Rajabi (IRI)	18
Liu Jintao (CHN)	16

=== Women's kyorugi ===
==== 46 kg ====
18 September

Round of 16
Tan Xueqin (CHN)	23
Khadija Rezaiee (AFG)	3
Saranya Raju (IND)
Farahnaz Yaqubi (AFG)	DQ
Julanan Khantikulanon (THA)
Lê Thị Thơm (VIE)	DQ
Ronna Ilao (PHI)	5
Fatemeh Maddahi (IRI)	10
Dhean Titania Fajrin (INA)	20^{P}
Isra Ilyas (PAK)	0
Al-Anoud Makanay (JOR)	4
Karen Cells (PHI)	12
Eman Al-Adaileh (JOR)	26
Sumana Munni (BAN)	10
Han Na-yeon (KOR)	9
Deanna Kyriazopoulos (AUS)	2

Quarterfinals
Tan Xueqin (CHN)	28
Farahnaz Yaqubi (AFG)	0
Lê Thị Thơm (VIE)	8
Fatemeh Maddahi (IRI)	9
Dhean Titania Fajrin (INA)	13
Karen Cells (PHI)	7
Eman Al-Adaileh (JOR)	2
Han Na-yeon (KOR)	16

Semifinals
Tan Xueqin (CHN)	9
Fatemeh Maddahi (IRI)	2
Dhean Titania Fajrin (INA)	1
Han Na-yeon (KOR)	2

Final
Tan Xueqin (CHN)	20
Han Na-yeon (KOR)	2

==== 49 kg ====
20 September

Round of 16
Hung Yu-ting (TPE)	11
Napatsorn Charanawat (THA)	3
Selbi Kiçigulowa (TKM)	8
Layan Jaber (PLE)	12
Lam Siu Wai (HKG)	11
Zuo Ju (CHN)	20
Trương Thị Tuyết Mai (VIE)	6
Bana Daraghmi (JOR)	7
Razan Al-Saaideh (JOR)	1
Kim Ji-hea (KOR)	16^{P}
Aýlar Gurbanowa (TKM)	1
Rheza Aragon (PHI)	10
Purva Dixit (IND)
Yeshi Wangmo (BHU)	DQ
Nila Ahmadi (AFG)	5
Keshena Waterford (AUS)	24^{P}

Quarterfinals
Hung Yu-ting (TPE)	12
Layan Jaber (PLE)	5
Zuo Ju (CHN)	9
Bana Daraghmi (JOR)	12
Kim Ji-hea (KOR)	26
Rheza Aragon (PHI)	12
Yeshi Wangmo (BHU)	1
Keshena Waterford (AUS)	25

Semifinals
Hung Yu-ting (TPE)	13
Bana Daraghmi (JOR)	8
Kim Ji-hea (KOR)	24
Keshena Waterford (AUS)	7

Final
Hung Yu-ting (TPE)	12
Kim Ji-hea (KOR)	11

==== 53 kg ====
19 September

Round of 16
Dinorahon Mamadibragimova (UZB)	16
Trương Thị Nhớ (VIE)	9
Neema Gurung (NEP)	2
Nahid Kiani (IRI)	22
Liang Chia-yu (TPE)	5
Woo Ha-young (KOR)	14^{P}
Meenu Kudiamssery (IND)
Taleen Hamaidi (JOR)	DQ
Wei Xiaojing (CHN)	25
Shokria Ahmadi (AFG)	2
Somaeh Gholami (AFG)	4
Phannapa Harnsujin (THA)	24
Rhezie Aragon (PHI)	19
Law Sin Yi (HKG)	2
Trần Thiên Kim (VIE)	4
Mariska Halinda (INA)	24

Quarterfinals
Dinorahon Mamadibragimova (UZB)	10
Nahid Kiani (IRI)	9
Woo Ha-young (KOR)	RSC
Taleen Hamaidi (JOR)
Wei Xiaojing (CHN)	7
Phannapa Harnsujin (THA)	10
Rhezie Aragon (PHI)	9
Mariska Halinda (INA)	14

Semifinals
Dinorahon Mamadibragimova (UZB)	3
Woo Ha-young (KOR)	15
Phannapa Harnsujin (THA)	8
Mariska Halinda (INA)	7

Final
Woo Ha-young (KOR)	15
Phannapa Harnsujin (THA)	12

==== 57 kg ====
21 September

Round of 16
Luna Abu Eisheh (JOR)	11
Amber Toves (GUM)	2
Tayyebeh Parsa (IRI)	23
Taieba Akbari (AFG)	6
Kim Dong-hwa (KOR)	14
Phạm Thị Thu Hiền (VIE)	12
Chen Yu-chuang (TPE)	DQ
Kashish Malik (IND)
Rawand Abu Shabayek (JOR)	4
Benjarat Yangtrakul (THA)	25
Chimi Dolma (BHU)	6
Walaa Al-Doseri (BRN)	10^{P}
Trần Thị Ánh Tuyết (VIE)	19
Pauline Lopez (PHI)	15

Quarterfinals
Zhou Lijun (CHN)	9
Luna Abu Eisheh (JOR)	3
Tayyebeh Parsa (IRI)	22
Kim Dong-hwa (KOR)	18
Chen Yu-chuang (TPE)	21
Benjarat Yangtrakul (THA)	11
Walaa Al-Doseri (BRN)	6
Trần Thị Ánh Tuyết (VIE)	29

Semifinals
Zhou Lijun (CHN)	17
Tayyebeh Parsa (IRI)	7
Chen Yu-chuang (TPE)	19
Trần Thị Ánh Tuyết (VIE)	12

Final
Zhou Lijun (CHN)	10
Chen Yu-chuang (TPE)	20

==== 62 kg ====
20 September

Round of 16
Zhang Mengyu (CHN)	DQ
Sonam Rawal (IND)
Hà Thị Nguyên (VIE)	27
Juwana Mohamed (BRN)	10
Lee Ye-ji (KOR)	5
Feng Xiao (MAC)	16
Umida Abdullaeva (UZB)	27
Jangchub Choden (BHU)	1
Malia Paseka (TGA)	0
Parisa Javadi (IRI)	31
Vincy Lo (HKG)	4
Thanapa Saelao (THA)	14
Bạc Thị Khiêm (VIE)	16
Gulim Bibalayeva (KAZ)	3

Quarterfinals
Lin Yi-ching (TPE)	8
Zhang Mengyu (CHN)	12
Hà Thị Nguyên (VIE)	12
Feng Xiao (MAC)	6
Umida Abdullaeva (UZB)	5
Parisa Javadi (IRI)	10
Thanapa Saelao (THA)	13
Bạc Thị Khiêm (VIE)	11

Semifinals
Zhang Mengyu (CHN)	18
Hà Thị Nguyên (VIE)	15
Parisa Javadi (IRI)	15
Thanapa Saelao (THA)	13

Final
Zhang Mengyu (CHN)	13
Parisa Javadi (IRI)	15

==== 67 kg ====
21 September

Round of 16
Aarti Khakal (IND)
Sonam Yangtsho (BHU)	DQ
Lâm Thị Hà Thanh (VIE)	14
Ananya Boonchum (THA)	8
Gao Pan (CHN)	8
Jang Eun-ji (KOR)	7

Quarterfinals
Ruth Hock (AUS)	29
Sonam Yangtsho (BHU)	2
Chen Yann-yeu (TPE)	7
Liu Qing (MAC)	2
Julyana Al-Sadeq (JOR)	15
Lâm Thị Hà Thanh (VIE)	13
Gao Pan (CHN)	24
Feruza Yergeshova (KAZ)	1

Semifinals
Ruth Hock (AUS)	2
Chen Yann-yeu (TPE)	11
Julyana Al-Sadeq (JOR)	6
Gao Pan (CHN)	23

Final
Chen Yann-yeu (TPE)	2
Gao Pan (CHN)	7

==== 73 kg ====
19 September

Round of 16
Jumana Mohamed (BRN)	DQ
Kanjana Sukeewas (THA)
Waad Al-Tarman (JOR)	3
Svetlana Osipova (UZB)	6
Lham Tshering (BHU)	1
Ma Ting-hsia (TPE)	25
Konifalanisesi Sisifa (TGA)
Myeong Mi-na (KOR)	DQ

Quarterfinals
Kirstie Alora (PHI)	17
Jumana Mohamed (BRN)	10
Svetlana Osipova (UZB)	DQ
Aishwarya Ravade (IND)
Niu Lulu (CHN)	15
Ma Ting-hsia (TPE)	18
Myeong Mi-na (KOR)	20
Mokhru Khalimova (TJK)	8

Semifinals
Kirstie Alora (PHI)	8
Svetlana Osipova (UZB)	16
Ma Ting-hsia (TPE)	6
Myeong Mi-na (KOR)	21

Final
Svetlana Osipova (UZB)	2
Myeong Mi-na (KOR)	10
