= Ahmad Smour =

Jordanian long-distance runner

Personal information
- Born: 12 January 1993 (age 32)

Sport
- Country: Jordan
- Sport: Long-distance running

Ahmad Smour (born 12 January 1993) is a Jordanian long-distance runner.

In 2017, he competed in the senior men's race at the 2017 IAAF World Cross Country Championships held in Kampala, Uganda. He was noted for being only one of three athletes to be the sole representatives of their country at the championships, having no other countrymen in his delegation. He finished in 97th place. In 2017, he also competed in the men's 3000 metres event at the 2017 Asian Indoor and Martial Arts Games held in Ashgabat, Turkmenistan. He was disqualified in the final after infringement of the inside border.

Smour set the Jordanian indoor record in the 3000 m in 2017 with a time of 8:37.56.

In 2018, he competed in the men's half marathon at the 2018 IAAF World Half Marathon Championships held in Valencia, Spain. He finished in 126th place.
