= Cheung Wang Fung =

Hong Kong hurdler (born 1997)

Personal information
- Born: 21 January 1997 (age 28)

Sport
- Sport: Athletics
- Event(s): 110 m hurdles, 60 m hurdles

Cheung Wang Fung (born 21 January 1997) is an athlete from Hong Kong specialising in the sprint hurdles. He represented his country at the 2018 World Indoor Championships without advancing from the first round. Additionally, he won a bronze medal at the 2017 Asian Indoor and Martial Arts Games.

His personal bests are 13.91 seconds in the 110 metres hurdles (2.0 m/s, Taipei 2023) and 7.83 seconds in the 60 metres hurdles (Nur-Sultan 2023). The latter is the current national record.

== International competitions ==
Year	Competition	Venue	Position	Event	Notes
Representing Hong Kong
2016	Asian Junior Championships	Ho Chi Minh City, Vietnam	5th	110 m hurdles (99.0 cm)	14.12
2016	Asian Junior Championships	Ho Chi Minh City, Vietnam	8th	4 × 400 m relay	3:25.87
2016	World U20 Championships	Bydgoszcz, Poland	38th (h)	110 m hurdles (99.0 cm)	14.11
2017	Asian Championships	Bhubaneswar, India	14th (h)	110 m hurdles	14.13
2017	Asian Indoor and Martial Arts Games	Ashgabat, Turkmenistan	3rd	60 m hurdles	7.85
2018	Asian Indoor Championships	Tehran, Iran	4th	60 m hurdles	7.87
2018	World Indoor Championships	Birmingham, United Kingdom	35th (h)	60 m hurdles	8.06
2023	Asian Indoor Championships	Astana, Kazakhstan	6th	60 m hurdles	7.84
2024	Asian Indoor Championships	Tehran, Iran	7th	60 m hurdles	8.12
