= Indoor athletics at the 2017 Asian Indoor and Martial Arts Games =

Athletics competition

- Venue: Ashgabat Indoor Athletics Arena
- Dates: 18–20 September 2017

Indoor athletics competition at the 2017 Asian Indoor and Martial Arts Games was held from 18–20 September 2017, at the Indoor Athletics Arena. 25 medal events were contested over three days - 13 for men, 12 for women in the absence of a women's pole vault.

Kazakhstan won most titles, with six golds, and were denied a seventh after winning the women's 4x400m relay by being disqualified for a lane violation. This elevated Turkmenistan to bronze, earning the host nation their first ever athletics medal at any version of the Asian Indoor Games, and only their fifth medal at any senior Asian Championships or Asian Games, indoor or outdoor. Kazakhstan's haul of 10 medals was matched by Thailand.

Indoor Athletics was on the Asian Indoor Games programme between 2005 and 2009, and returned at the Ashgabat 2017 5th Asian Indoor & Martial Arts Games after being skipped in 2013.

== Medalists ==
=== Men ===
| Event | Gold | | Silver | | Bronze | |
|---|---|---|---|---|---|---|
| 60 m | Hassan Taftian; Iran | 6.55 | Eric Cray; Philippines | 6.63 | Reza Ghasemi; Iran | 6.64 |
| 400 m | Abdalelah Haroun; Qatar | 45.68; GR | Mazen Al-Yassin; Saudi Arabia | 46.35 | Mikhail Litvin; Kazakhstan | 46.51 |
| 800 m | Jamal Hairane; Qatar | 1:49.33 | Indunil Herath; Sri Lanka | 1:49.45 | Amir Moradi; Iran | 1:49.51 |
| 1500 m | Ajay Kumar Saroj; India | 3:48.67 | Mohammed Shaween; Saudi Arabia | 3:49.65 | Adnan Taess; Iraq | 3:50.98 |
| 3000 m | Govindan Lakshmanan; India | 8:02.30 | Tariq Al-Amri; Saudi Arabia | 8:03.98 | Hossein Keyhani; Iran | 8:07.09 |
| 60 m hurdles | Ahmed Al-Muwallad; Saudi Arabia | 7.66; GR | Lee Jung-joon; South Korea | 7.77 | Cheung Wang Fung; Hong Kong | 7.85 |
| 4 × 400 m relay | Pakistan; Asad Iqbal; Mehboob Ali; Nishat Ali; Nokar Hussain | 3:11.40 | Qatar; Abdalelah Haroun; Mohamed Nasir Abbas; Jamal Hairane; Ali Hassan Al-Jassim; Hashim Salah Mohamed | 3:12.58 | Thailand; Apisit Chamsri; Nattapong Kongkraphan; Jirayu Pleenaram; Phitchaya Sunthonthuam; Nattapong Khanom | 3:21.21 |
| High jump | Majdeddin Ghazal; Syria | 2.26; GR | Keivan Ghanbarzadeh; Iran | 2.26 =GR | Manjula Kumara; Sri Lanka | 2.21 |
| Pole vault | Sergey Grigoryev; Kazakhstan | 5.40 | Porranot Purahong; Thailand | 5.20 | Patsapong Amsam-ang; Thailand | 5.20 |
| Long jump | Nguyễn Tiến Trọng; Vietnam | 7.48 | Amila Jayasiri; Sri Lanka | 7.45 | Chan Ming Tai; Hong Kong | 7.44 |
| Triple jump | Arpinder Singh; India | 16.21 | Pratchaya Tepparak; Thailand | 16.12 | Rashid Al-Mannai; Qatar | 15.99 |
| Shot put | Ivan Ivanov; Kazakhstan | 19.60 | Tajinderpal Singh Toor; India | 19.26 | Jung Il-woo; South Korea | 19.24 |
| Heptathlon | Mohammed Al-Qaree; Saudi Arabia | 5343 | Sutthisak Singkhon; Thailand | 5332 | Marat Khaydarov; Uzbekistan | 5018 |

=== Women ===
| Event | Gold | | Silver | | Bronze | |
|---|---|---|---|---|---|---|
| 60 m | Viktoriya Zyabkina; Kazakhstan | 7.32 | Lê Tú Chinh; Vietnam | 7.36 | Olga Safronova; Kazakhstan | 7.43 |
| 400 m | Elina Mikhina; Kazakhstan | 53.37 | Nguyễn Thị Hằng; Vietnam | 54.41 | Atchima Eng-chuan; Thailand | 54.45 |
| 800 m | Gayanthika Abeyratne; Sri Lanka | 2:05.12 | Zhang Guiping; China | 2:07.65 | Arina Kleshchukova; Kyrgyzstan | 2:09.97 |
| 1500 m | P. U. Chitra; India | 4:27.77 | Gulshanoi Satarova; Kyrgyzstan | 4:31.64 | Arina Kleshchukova; Kyrgyzstan | 4:34.16 |
| 3000 m | Alia Saeed Mohammed; United Arab Emirates | 9:25.03 | Sanjivani Jadhav; India | 9:26.34 | Wang Jinyu; China | 9:57.43 |
| 60 m hurdles | Lui Lai Yiu; Hong Kong | 8.41 | Suchada Meesri; Thailand | 8.56 | Anastassiya Vinogradova; Kazakhstan | 8.59 |
| 4 × 400 m relay | Thailand; Supanich Poolkerd; Pornpan Hoemhuk; Treewadee Yongphan; Atchima Eng-chuan | 3:43.41 | China; Li Xingyuan; Tao Yanan; Zhu Cuiwei; Wang Meiru | 3:47.35 | Turkmenistan; Walentina Meredowa; Mariýa Rozymowa; Täjigözel Orazgeldiýewa; Ýelena Rýabowa | 3:50.39 |
| High jump | Nadiya Dusanova; Uzbekistan | 1.86 | Safina Sadullayeva; Uzbekistan | 1.83 | Yeung Man Wai; Hong Kong | 1.83 |
| Long jump | Olga Rypakova; Kazakhstan | 6.43 | Bùi Thị Thu Thảo; Vietnam | 6.36 | Neena Varakil; India | 6.04 |
| Triple jump | Olga Rypakova; Kazakhstan | 14.32 | Mariya Ovchinnikova; Kazakhstan | 13.21 | Tan Qiujiao; China | 13.10 |
| Shot put | Bian Ka; China | 17.34 | Elena Smolyanova; Uzbekistan | 15.60 | Lee Soo-jung; South Korea | 15.54 |
| Pentathlon | Purnima Hembram; India | 4062 | Wassana Winatho; Thailand | 3915 | Sunisa Khotseemueang; Thailand | 3903 |

== Medal table ==
| Rank | Nation | Gold | Silver | Bronze | Total |
|---|---|---|---|---|---|
| 1 | Kazakhstan (KAZ) | 6 | 1 | 3 | 10 |
| 2 | India (IND) | 5 | 2 | 1 | 8 |
| 3 | Saudi Arabia (KSA) | 2 | 3 | 0 | 5 |
| 4 | Qatar (QAT) | 2 | 1 | 1 | 4 |
| 5 | Thailand (THA) | 1 | 5 | 4 | 10 |
| 6 | Vietnam (VIE) | 1 | 3 | 0 | 4 |
| 7 | China (CHN) | 1 | 2 | 2 | 5 |
| 8 | Sri Lanka (SRI) | 1 | 2 | 1 | 4 |
| 8 | Uzbekistan (UZB) | 1 | 2 | 1 | 4 |
| 10 | Iran (IRI) | 1 | 1 | 3 | 5 |
| 11 | Hong Kong (HKG) | 1 | 0 | 3 | 4 |
| 12 | Pakistan (PAK) | 1 | 0 | 0 | 1 |
| 12 | Syria (SYR) | 1 | 0 | 0 | 1 |
| 12 | United Arab Emirates (UAE) | 1 | 0 | 0 | 1 |
| 15 | Kyrgyzstan (KGZ) | 0 | 1 | 2 | 3 |
| 15 | South Korea (KOR) | 0 | 1 | 2 | 3 |
| 17 | Philippines (PHI) | 0 | 1 | 0 | 1 |
| 18 | Iraq (IRQ) | 0 | 0 | 1 | 1 |
| 18 | Turkmenistan (TKM) | 0 | 0 | 1 | 1 |
| Totals (19 entries) | | 25 | 25 | 25 | 75 |

== Results ==
=== Men ===
==== 60 m ====
19 September

===== Round 1 =====
| Rank | Athlete | Time |
Heat 1
| 1 | Hassan Taftian (IRI) | 6.99 |
| 2 | Alişer Sadulaýew (TKM) | 7.01 |
| 3 | Muhammad Shahbaz (PAK) | 7.03 |
| 4 | Amiya Kumar Mallick (IND) | 7.04 |
| 5 | Ibrahim Ashfan Ali (MDV) | 7.28 |
| — | Fahhad Al-Subaie (KSA) | DSQ |
| — | George Molisingi (VAN) | DSQ |
Heat 2
| 1 | Abdullah Abkar Mohammed (KSA) | 6.74 |
| 2 | Bandit Chuangchai (THA) | 6.89 |
| 3 | Khalil Al-Hanahneh (JOR) | 7.25 |
| 4 | Lam Cho Kei (MAC) | 7.32 |
| 5 | Tupou Koliano (TUV) | 7.48 |
| — | Alvin Martin (FSM) | DSQ |
Heat 3
| 1 | Eric Cray (PHI) | 6.85 |
| 2 | Aaron Powell (FIJ) | 6.96 |
| 3 | Daniel Philimon (VAN) | 7.06 |
| 4 | Akmyrat Orazgeldiýew (TKM) | 7.08 |
| 5 | Abdelrahman Abu Al-Hummos (JOR) | 7.17 |
| 6 | Alisher Pulotov (TJK) | 7.26 |
| 7 | Jacob Willy (KIR) | 7.68 |
Heat 4
| 1 | Huang Yonglian (CHN) | 6.76 |
| 2 | Reza Ghasemi (IRI) | 6.85 |
| 3 | Himasha Eashan (SRI) | 6.89 |
| 4 | Suebsakul Payakkul (THA) | 7.08 |
| 5 | Joshua Jeremiah (NRU) | 7.36 |
| 6 | Isaac Silafau (ASA) | 7.40 |
| 7 | Jeki Lanki (MHL) | 7.40 |
Heat 5
| 1 | Cho Kyu-won (KOR) | 6.90 |
| 2 | Ng Ka Fung (HKG) | 6.90 |
| 3 | Davron Atabaev (TJK) | 7.13 |
| 4 | Estanis Ikelap (FSM) | 7.51 |
| — | Shamsuddin Shamo (AFG) | DSQ |
| — | Ahmed Anoof Mohamed (MDV) | DNS |
| — | Tosin Ogunode (QAT) | DNS |
Heat 6
| 1 | Barakat Al-Harthi (OMA) | 6.80 |
| 2 | Vladislav Grigoryev (KAZ) | 6.86 |
| 3 | Jeremy Dodson (SAM) | 6.97 |
| 4 | He Yuhong (CHN) | 7.01 |
| 5 | Aligadzhi Magamedgadzhiev (KGZ) | 7.09 |
| 6 | Tirioro Willie (KIR) | 7.25 |
| 7 | Richson Simeon (MHL) | 7.81 |

===== Semifinals =====
| Rank | Athlete | Time |
Heat 1
| 1 | Reza Ghasemi (IRI) | 6.72 |
| 2 | Huang Yonglian (CHN) | 6.74 |
| 3 | Cho Kyu-won (KOR) | 6.82 |
| 4 | Jeremy Dodson (SAM) | 6.86 |
| 5 | Aaron Powell (FIJ) | 6.87 |
| 6 | Suebsakul Payakkul (THA) | 7.06 |
| 7 | Amiya Kumar Mallick (IND) | 7.06 |
| 8 | Davron Atabaev (TJK) | 7.11 |
Heat 2
| 1 | Barakat Al-Harthi (OMA) | 6.66 |
| 2 | Eric Cray (PHI) | 6.70 |
| 3 | Bandit Chuangchai (THA) | 6.78 |
| 4 | Ng Ka Fung (HKG) | 6.83 |
| 5 | Muhammad Shahbaz (PAK) | 7.04 |
| 6 | Akmyrat Orazgeldiýew (TKM) | 7.05 |
| 7 | Daniel Philimon (VAN) | 7.12 |
| 8 | Abdelrahman Abu Al-Hummos (JOR) | 7.13 |
Heat 3
| 1 | Abdullah Abkar Mohammed (KSA) | 6.67 |
| 2 | Hassan Taftian (IRI) | 6.71 |
| 3 | Vladislav Grigoryev (KAZ) | 6.85 |
| 4 | Himasha Eashan (SRI) | 6.89 |
| 5 | Alişer Sadulaýew (TKM) | 7.03 |
| 6 | Aligadzhi Magamedgadzhiev (KGZ) | 7.04 |
| 7 | He Yuhong (CHN) | 7.06 |
| 8 | Khalil Al-Hanahneh (JOR) | 7.29 |

===== Final =====
| Rank | Athlete | Time |
|---|---|---|
| 1st place, gold medalist(s) | Hassan Taftian (IRI) | 6.55 |
| 2nd place, silver medalist(s) | Eric Cray (PHI) | 6.63 |
| 3rd place, bronze medalist(s) | Reza Ghasemi (IRI) | 6.64 |
| 4 | Barakat Al-Harthi (OMA) | 6.67 |
| 5 | Huang Yonglian (CHN) | 6.71 |
| 6 | Cho Kyu-won (KOR) | 6.82 |
| 7 | Bandit Chuangchai (THA) | 6.83 |
| — | Abdullah Abkar Mohammed (KSA) | DSQ |

==== 400 m ====
===== Round 1 =====
18 September

| Rank | Athlete | Time |
Heat 1
| 1 | Davron Atabaev (TJK) | 49.83 |
| 2 | Deng Hantao (CHN) | 50.42 |
| 3 | Nathan Kalman (VAN) | 50.67 |
| 4 | Wiyual Puok Deng (ART) | 50.96 |
| — | Abderrahman Samba (QAT) | DNS |
Heat 2
| 1 | Amoj Jacob (IND) | 49.17 |
| 2 | Igor Kondratyev (KAZ) | 49.35 |
| 3 | Majd Al-Diabat (JOR) | 50.69 |
| 4 | Ali Sham (MDV) | 51.37 |
| — | Eziz Sähetnyýazow (TKM) | DSQ |
Heat 3
| 1 | Mehboob Ali (PAK) | 48.63 |
| 2 | Apisit Chamsri (THA) | 48.79 |
| 3 | Xu Bo (CHN) | 49.69 |
| 4 | Grigoriy Derepaskin (TJK) | 50.40 |
| — | Mohamed Naail (MDV) | DSQ |
| — | Parwiz Saraji (AFG) | DSQ |
Heat 4
| 1 | Ali Khadivar (IRI) | 48.66 |
| 2 | Phitchaya Sunthonthuam (THA) | 48.96 |
| 3 | Abdelrahman Abu Al-Hummos (JOR) | 49.82 |
| 4 | Kirill Sarasov (KGZ) | 49.98 |
| — | Mahmoud Alloh (PLE) | DNS |
Heat 5
| 1 | Mikhail Litvin (KAZ) | 47.51 |
| 2 | Mazen Al-Yassin (KSA) | 48.04 |
| 3 | Nokar Hussain (PAK) | 48.40 |
| 4 | Begmyrat Makgaýew (TKM) | 50.47 |
| 5 | Ryon Gaines (PLW) | 57.43 |
Heat 6
| 1 | Abdalelah Haroun (QAT) | 49.09 |
| 2 | Ahmed Mubarak Al-Saadi (OMA) | 49.36 |
| 3 | Samuela Railoa (FIJ) | 49.58 |
| 4 | Paul Nalau (VAN) | 51.09 |
| 5 | Athan Arizanga (GUM) | 55.72 |

===== Semifinals =====
18 September

| Rank | Athlete | Time |
Heat 1
| 1 | Mikhail Litvin (KAZ) | 46.85 |
| 2 | Mazen Al-Yassin (KSA) | 46.98 |
| 3 | Davron Atabaev (TJK) | 48.57 |
| 4 | Nokar Hussain (PAK) | 48.77 |
| 5 | Deng Hantao (CHN) | 51.06 |
| — | Kirill Sarasov (KGZ) | DNS |
Heat 2
| 1 | Amoj Jacob (IND) | 47.94 |
| 2 | Ahmed Mubarak Al-Saadi (OMA) | 49.50 |
| 3 | Samuela Railoa (FIJ) | 49.55 |
| 4 | Grigoriy Derepaskin (TJK) | 50.69 |
| 5 | Apisit Chamsri (THA) | 51.35 |
| — | Mehboob Ali (PAK) | DSQ |
Heat 3
| 1 | Abdalelah Haroun (QAT) | 48.38 |
| 2 | Ali Khadivar (IRI) | 48.51 |
| 3 | Igor Kondratyev (KAZ) | 48.98 |
| 4 | Abdelrahman Abu Al-Hummos (JOR) | 49.01 |
| 5 | Xu Bo (CHN) | 49.77 |
| 6 | Phitchaya Sunthonthuam (THA) | 51.22 |

===== Final =====
19 September

| Rank | Athlete | Time |
|---|---|---|
| 1st place, gold medalist(s) | Abdalelah Haroun (QAT) | 45.68 |
| 2nd place, silver medalist(s) | Mazen Al-Yassin (KSA) | 46.35 |
| 3rd place, bronze medalist(s) | Mikhail Litvin (KAZ) | 46.51 |
| 4 | Ali Khadivar (IRI) | 47.04 |
| 5 | Amoj Jacob (IND) | 47.33 |
| 6 | Ahmed Mubarak Al-Saadi (OMA) | 48.46 |

==== 800 m ====
===== Round 1 =====
18 September

| Rank | Athlete | Time |
Heat 1
| 1 | Jamal Hairane (QAT) | 1:54.54 |
| 2 | Liu Dezhu (CHN) | 1:55.04 |
| 3 | Marco Vilog (PHI) | 1:56.62 |
| 4 | Azat Wemmiýew (TKM) | 1:57.46 |
| 5 | Gai Nyang Tap (ART) | 1:58.70 |
| — | Samim Yari (AFG) | DNF |
Heat 2
| 1 | Indunil Herath (SRI) | 1:53.79 |
| 2 | Khurshidjon Akhmadaliev (UZB) | 1:54.22 |
| 3 | Bashar Al-Kufrini (JOR) | 1:55.23 |
| 4 | Yiech Biel (ART) | 1:55.29 |
| 5 | Ilaman Ereşow (TKM) | 2:02.54 |
Heat 3
| 1 | Amir Moradi (IRI) | 1:54.43 |
| 2 | Musulman Dzholomanov (KGZ) | 1:55.12 |
| 3 | Park Hyo-jun (KOR) | 1:55.97 |
| 4 | Aleksandr Pronzhenko (TJK) | 1:59.73 |
| 5 | Mo'men Al-Masaeid (JOR) | 2:00.18 |
Heat 4
| 1 | Abdalelah Haroun (QAT) | 1:56.06 |
| 2 | Mayouf Hassan (UAE) | 1:56.18 |
| 3 | Chang Yizhong (CHN) | 1:56.20 |
| 4 | Sergey Zaikov (KAZ) | 1:56.59 |
| 5 | Odilshoh Ismatov (TJK) | 1:56.71 |
| 6 | Kim Jun-young (KOR) | 1:57.83 |

===== Semifinals =====
19 September

| Rank | Athlete | Time |
Heat 1
| 1 | Indunil Herath (SRI) | 1:50.91 |
| 2 | Mayouf Hassan (UAE) | 1:52.22 |
| 3 | Khurshidjon Akhmadaliev (UZB) | 1:52.49 |
| 4 | Liu Dezhu (CHN) | 1:53.76 |
| 5 | Yiech Biel (ART) | 1:56.53 |
| 6 | Abdalelah Haroun (QAT) | 2:07.94 |
Heat 2
| 1 | Amir Moradi (IRI) | 1:51.47 |
| 2 | Jamal Hairane (QAT) | 1:51.92 |
| 3 | Musulman Dzholomanov (KGZ) | 1:52.79 |
| 4 | Bashar Al-Kufrini (JOR) | 1:53.47 |
| 5 | Chang Yizhong (CHN) | 1:54.20 |
| 6 | Park Hyo-jun (KOR) | 1:54.66 |

===== Final =====
20 September

| Rank | Athlete | Time |
|---|---|---|
| 1st place, gold medalist(s) | Jamal Hairane (QAT) | 1:49.33 |
| 2nd place, silver medalist(s) | Indunil Herath (SRI) | 1:49.45 |
| 3rd place, bronze medalist(s) | Amir Moradi (IRI) | 1:49.51 |
| 4 | Musulman Dzholomanov (KGZ) | 1:51.12 |
| 5 | Mayouf Hassan (UAE) | 1:51.68 |
| 6 | Khurshidjon Akhmadaliev (UZB) | 1:52.81 |

==== 1500 m ====
===== Round 1 =====
19 September

| Rank | Athlete | Time |
Heat 1
| 1 | Awwad Al-Sharafat (JOR) | 3:58.43 |
| 2 | Hamza Driouch (QAT) | 3:58.86 |
| 3 | Saud Al-Zaabi (UAE) | 3:59.28 |
| 4 | Kim Yong-soo (KOR) | 3:59.86 |
| 5 | Zhan Qi (CHN) | 4:05.15 |
| 6 | Tanaton Graiyarat (THA) | 4:13.77 |
| — | Musulman Dzholomanov (KGZ) | DNF |
Heat 2
| 1 | Ajay Kumar Saroj (IND) | 3:51.55 |
| 2 | Mohammed Shaween (KSA) | 3:56.90 |
| 3 | Zhang Dayu (CHN) | 3:58.56 |
| 4 | Paulo Amotun Lokoro (ART) | 3:59.45 |
| 5 | Hamza Al-Ashoush (JOR) | 4:00.34 |
| — | Jamal Hairane (QAT) | DSQ |
Heat 3
| 1 | Moslem Niadoust (IRI) | 3:58.23 |
| 2 | Adnan Taess (IRQ) | 3:59.35 |
| 3 | Yothin Yaprajan (THA) | 3:59.82 |
| 4 | Perhat Annagylyjow (TKM) | 4:02.87 |
| 5 | Mervin Guarte (PHI) | 4:04.76 |
| 6 | Ilaman Ereşow (TKM) | 4:06.43 |

===== Final =====
20 September

| Rank | Athlete | Time |
|---|---|---|
| 1st place, gold medalist(s) | Ajay Kumar Saroj (IND) | 3:48.67 |
| 2nd place, silver medalist(s) | Mohammed Shaween (KSA) | 3:49.65 |
| 3rd place, bronze medalist(s) | Adnan Taess (IRQ) | 3:50.98 |
| 4 | Awwad Al-Sharafat (JOR) | 3:53.65 |
| 5 | Hamza Driouch (QAT) | 3:57.48 |
| 6 | Moslem Niadoust (IRI) | 3:58.65 |
| 7 | Saud Al-Zaabi (UAE) | 3:59.32 |
| 8 | Zhang Dayu (CHN) | 4:08.38 |
| — | Paulo Amotun Lokoro (ART) | DNS |

==== 3000 m ====
===== Round 1 =====
18 September

| Rank | Athlete | Time |
Heat 1
| 1 | Govindan Lakshmanan (IND) | 8:50.81 |
| 2 | Nguyễn Văn Lai (VIE) | 8:52.61 |
| 3 | Hashim Salah Mohamed (QAT) | 8:54.45 |
| 4 | Sharif El-Atawneh (JOR) | 8:54.82 |
| 5 | Ukuk Utho'o Bul (ART) | 8:56.16 |
| 6 | Şakirjan Durdyýew (TKM) | 8:58.51 |
| 7 | Tao Zelang (CHN) | 9:01.08 |
| 8 | Nattawat Bunupala (THA) | 9:08.75 |
| 9 | Maksat Öwlýagulyýew (TKM) | 9:09.86 |
Heat 2
| 1 | Yaser Bagharab (QAT) | 8:22.72 |
| 2 | Tariq Al-Amri (KSA) | 8:23.03 |
| 3 | Hossein Keyhani (IRI) | 8:30.24 |
| 4 | Ahmad Smour (JOR) | 8:37.56 |
| 5 | Sanchai Namkhet (THA) | 8:39.43 |
| 6 | Yang Kegu (CHN) | 8:40.27 |
| 7 | Patrick Kam (SOL) | 9:16.41 |
| 8 | Avikash Lal (FIJ) | 9:53.02 |
| — | Ibrahim Al-Baddi (PLE) | DNS |

===== Final =====
19 September

| Rank | Athlete | Time |
|---|---|---|
| 1st place, gold medalist(s) | Govindan Lakshmanan (IND) | 8:02.30 |
| 2nd place, silver medalist(s) | Tariq Al-Amri (KSA) | 8:03.98 |
| 3rd place, bronze medalist(s) | Hossein Keyhani (IRI) | 8:07.09 |
| 4 | Hashim Salah Mohamed (QAT) | 8:07.60 |
| 5 | Yaser Bagharab (QAT) | 8:07.67 |
| 6 | Nguyễn Văn Lai (VIE) | 8:24.69 |
| 7 | Ukuk Utho'o Bul (ART) | 8:33.02 |
| 8 | Sanchai Namkhet (THA) | 8:36.95 |
| 9 | Sharif El-Atawneh (JOR) | 8:41.37 |
| 10 | Şakirjan Durdyýew (TKM) | 8:43.81 |
| 11 | Yang Kegu (CHN) | 8:45.06 |
| — | Ahmad Smour (JOR) | DSQ |

==== 60 m hurdles ====
18 September

===== Round 1 =====
| Rank | Athlete | Time |
Heat 1
| 1 | Mahdi Al-Othman (KSA) | 8.06 |
| 2 | Apisit Puanglamyai (THA) | 8.23 |
| 3 | Lai Ho Tat (MAC) | 8.26 |
| 4 | Ahmad Hazer (LBN) | 8.27 |
| 5 | Mohsin Ali (PAK) | 8.29 |
| 6 | Zhu Shenglong (CHN) | 8.40 |
| 7 | Rifat Habibulin (TKM) | 9.20 |
| 8 | Baker Al-Habahba (JOR) | 9.28 |
Heat 2
| 1 | Ahmed Al-Muwallad (KSA) | 7.89 |
| 2 | Cheung Wang Fung (HKG) | 8.00 |
| 3 | Lee Jung-joon (KOR) | 8.08 |
| 4 | Lu Hao-hua (TPE) | 8.16 |
| 5 | Errol Qaqa (FIJ) | 8.45 |
| 6 | Yi Yulong (CHN) | 8.67 |
| 7 | Serdar Oratdyýew (TKM) | 8.84 |

===== Final =====
| Rank | Athlete | Time |
|---|---|---|
| 1st place, gold medalist(s) | Ahmed Al-Muwallad (KSA) | 7.66 |
| 2nd place, silver medalist(s) | Lee Jung-joon (KOR) | 7.77 |
| 3rd place, bronze medalist(s) | Cheung Wang Fung (HKG) | 7.85 |
| 4 | Mahdi Al-Othman (KSA) | 7.97 |
| 5 | Apisit Puanglamyai (THA) | 8.12 |
| 6 | Lu Hao-hua (TPE) | 8.13 |
| 7 | Ahmad Hazer (LBN) | 8.23 |
| 8 | Lai Ho Tat (MAC) | 8.24 |

==== 4 × 400 m relay ====
20 September

===== Round 1 =====
| Rank | Team | Time |
Heat 1
| 1 | Pakistan (PAK) | 3:14.09 |
| 2 | Thailand (THA) | 3:14.19 |
| 3 | Turkmenistan (TKM) | 3:19.01 |
| — | Kazakhstan (KAZ) | DNF |
| — | Tajikistan (TJK) | DSQ |
Heat 2
| 1 | Qatar (QAT) | 3:21.38 |
| 2 | China (CHN) | 3:21.97 |
| 3 | Vanuatu (VAN) | 3:28.52 |
| — | Jordan (JOR) | DSQ |
| — | Saudi Arabia (KSA) | DSQ |

===== Final =====
| Rank | Team | Time |
|---|---|---|
| 1st place, gold medalist(s) | Pakistan (PAK) | 3:11.40 |
| 2nd place, silver medalist(s) | Qatar (QAT) | 3:12.58 |
| 3rd place, bronze medalist(s) | Thailand (THA) | 3:21.21 |
| 4 | China (CHN) | 3:23.13 |
| 5 | Vanuatu (VAN) | 3:29.30 |
| — | Turkmenistan (TKM) | DSQ |

==== High jump ====
20 September

| Rank | Athlete | Result |
|---|---|---|
| 1st place, gold medalist(s) | Majdeddin Ghazal (SYR) | 2.26 |
| 2nd place, silver medalist(s) | Keivan Ghanbarzadeh (IRI) | 2.26 |
| 3rd place, bronze medalist(s) | Manjula Kumara (SRI) | 2.21 |
| 4 | Hamdi Al-Amine (QAT) | 2.18 |
| 5 | Roman Loshkarev (KAZ) | 2.10 |
| 6 | Dmitriy Melsitov (UZB) | 2.10 |
| 7 | Liu Liming (CHN) | 2.05 |
| 8 | Saksit Sittichai (THA) | 2.00 |
| 9 | Şirgeldi Utomyşow (TKM) | 1.95 |
| 10 | Husniddin Zaripov (TJK) | 1.95 |
| 11 | Lataisi Mwea (KIR) | 1.95 |
| 12 | Liu Tsu-yuan (TPE) | 1.85 |
| 13 | Merdan Nyýazgulyýew (TKM) | 1.80 |

==== Pole vault ====
18 September

| Rank | Athlete | Result |
|---|---|---|
| 1st place, gold medalist(s) | Sergey Grigoryev (KAZ) | 5.40 |
| 2nd place, silver medalist(s) | Porranot Purahong (THA) | 5.20 |
| 3rd place, bronze medalist(s) | Patsapong Amsam-ang (THA) | 5.20 |
| 4 | Muntadher Faleh (IRQ) | 5.10 |
| 5 | Chen Yang (CHN) | 4.60 |
| 6 | Yang Lucheng (CHN) | 4.40 |

==== Long jump ====
19 September

| Rank | Athlete | Result |
|---|---|---|
| 1st place, gold medalist(s) | Nguyễn Tiến Trọng (VIE) | 7.48 |
| 2nd place, silver medalist(s) | Amila Jayasiri (SRI) | 7.45 |
| 3rd place, bronze medalist(s) | Chan Ming Tai (HKG) | 7.44 |
| 4 | Janry Ubas (PHI) | 7.40 |
| 5 | Lau Kin Hei (HKG) | 7.32 |
| 6 | Samsheer Sullia Ebrahim (IND) | 7.18 |
| 7 | Phichet Tharuaruk (THA) | 7.12 |
| 8 | He Xilong (CHN) | 7.07 |
| 9 | Wen Hua-yu (TPE) | 7.05 |
| 10 | Bahtiýar Rozyýew (TKM) | 6.95 |
| 11 | Liu Tsu-yuan (TPE) | 6.88 |
| 12 | Guwanç Mättaganow (TKM) | 6.87 |
| 13 | Ahmad Walid (JOR) | 6.48 |
| 14 | Isaac Silafau (ASA) | 6.12 |
| 15 | Frenly Wolul (VAN) | 5.98 |
| 16 | Buraieta Yeeting (KIR) | 5.70 |
| — | Muhannad Al-Absi (KSA) | NM |
| — | Tao Yege (CHN) | NM |

==== Triple jump ====
20 September

| Rank | Athlete | Result |
|---|---|---|
| 1st place, gold medalist(s) | Arpinder Singh (IND) | 16.21 |
| 2nd place, silver medalist(s) | Pratchaya Tepparak (THA) | 16.12 |
| 3rd place, bronze medalist(s) | Rashid Al-Mannai (QAT) | 15.99 |
| 4 | Supot Boonnun (THA) | 15.87 |
| 5 | Karthik Unnikrishnan (IND) | 15.84 |
| 6 | Hassan Dawshi (KSA) | 15.61 |
| 7 | Ruslan Kurbanov (UZB) | 15.48 |
| 8 | Wan Hanchen (CHN) | 15.26 |
| 9 | Muhammad Afzal (PAK) | 14.73 |
| 10 | Ko Ho Long (HKG) | 14.39 |
| 11 | Ýusup Bozaganow (TKM) | 14.23 |
| 12 | Bahtiýar Rozyýew (TKM) | 14.19 |
| 13 | Ahmad Walid (JOR) | 13.80 |
| — | Zheng Zehao (CHN) | NM |

==== Shot put ====
18 September

| Rank | Athlete | Result |
|---|---|---|
| 1st place, gold medalist(s) | Ivan Ivanov (KAZ) | 19.60 |
| 2nd place, silver medalist(s) | Tajinderpal Singh Toor (IND) | 19.26 |
| 3rd place, bronze medalist(s) | Jung Il-woo (KOR) | 19.24 |
| 4 | Sergey Dementev (UZB) | 18.87 |
| 5 | Om Prakash Karhana (IND) | 18.80 |
| 6 | Tian Zizhong (CHN) | 18.42 |
| 7 | Liu Yang (CHN) | 18.24 |
| 8 | Sultan Al-Hebshi (KSA) | 18.16 |
| 9 | Ali Samari (IRI) | 17.26 |
| 10 | Amin Al-Aradi (KSA) | 16.69 |
| 11 | Promrob Juntima (THA) | 16.58 |
| 12 | Thawat Khachin (THA) | 16.45 |
| 13 | Lai Chin-hao (TPE) | 16.31 |
| 14 | Ma Hau-wei (TPE) | 16.27 |
| 15 | Maksat Mämmedow (TKM) | 16.13 |
| 16 | Musaeb Al-Momani (JOR) | 15.81 |
| 17 | Tejen Hommadow (TKM) | 15.28 |
| 18 | Mustafa Fall (FIJ) | 14.62 |
| 19 | Noor Ullah Osmani (AFG) | 14.05 |

==== Heptathlon ====
19–20 September

| Rank | Athlete | 60M | Long jump | Shot put | High jump | 60M hurdles | Pole vault | 1000M | Total |
|---|---|---|---|---|---|---|---|---|---|
| 1st place, gold medalist(s) | Mohammed Al-Qaree (KSA) | 7.01; 879 | 7.02; 818 | 12.82; 656 | 1.94; 749 | 8.28; 913 | 4.40; 731 | 3:07.06; 597 | 5343 |
| 2nd place, silver medalist(s) | Sutthisak Singkhon (THA) | 7.05; 865 | 7.32; 891 | 14.00; 728 | 1.91; 723 | 8.49; 862 | 4.20; 673 | 3:07.82; 590 | 5332 |
| 3rd place, bronze medalist(s) | Marat Khaydarov (UZB) | 7.44; 732 | 6.74; 753 | 12.93; 663 | 1.79; 619 | 8.57; 843 | 4.70; 819 | 3:07.88; 589 | 5018 |
| 4 | Adisak Meeboonya (THA) | 7.43; 736 | 5.78; 540 | 11.64; 585 | 1.85; 670 | 8.77; 797 | 3.50; 482 | 3:00.59; 658 | 4468 |
| — | Abhishek Nadubailu (IND) | 7.44; 732 | 6.42; 679 | 12.84; 657 | 1.70; 544 | 8.76; 800 | NM; 0 | DNS | DNF |

=== Women ===
==== 60 m ====
19 September

===== Round 1 =====
| Rank | Athlete | Time |
Heat 1
| 1 | Dutee Chand (IND) | 7.44 |
| 2 | Feng Lulu (CHN) | 7.46 |
| 3 | Nigina Sharipova (UZB) | 7.47 |
| 4 | Kanyarat Pakdee (THA) | 7.65 |
| 5 | Makereta Naulu (FIJ) | 7.69 |
| 6 | Ýelena Rýabowa (TKM) | 7.79 |
| 7 | Asenate Manoa (TUV) | 8.69 |
| 8 | Kamia Yousufi (AFG) | 8.90 |
Heat 2
| 1 | Lê Tú Chinh (VIE) | 7.39 |
| 2 | Olga Safronova (KAZ) | 7.57 |
| 3 | Chan Pui Kei (HKG) | 7.62 |
| 4 | Supawan Thipat (THA) | 7.70 |
| 5 | Aziza Sbaity (LBN) | 7.77 |
| 6 | Gong Luying (CHN) | 7.80 |
| 7 | Shania Bulala (GUM) | 8.20 |
| 8 | Samantha Rofo (SOL) | 8.74 |
Heat 3
| 1 | Viktoriya Zyabkina (KAZ) | 7.41 |
| 2 | Lam On Ki (HKG) | 7.46 |
| 3 | Walentina Meredowa (TKM) | 7.46 |
| 4 | Loi Im Lan (MAC) | 7.72 |
| 5 | Braelynn Yee (FIJ) | 7.98 |
| 6 | Najma Parveen (PAK) | 8.11 |
| 7 | Anoud Muhaisen (JOR) | 8.18 |
| 8 | Maura Ngirmechaet (PLW) | 8.80 |

===== Final =====
| Rank | Athlete | Time |
|---|---|---|
| 1st place, gold medalist(s) | Viktoriya Zyabkina (KAZ) | 7.32 |
| 2nd place, silver medalist(s) | Lê Tú Chinh (VIE) | 7.36 |
| 3rd place, bronze medalist(s) | Olga Safronova (KAZ) | 7.43 |
| 4 | Dutee Chand (IND) | 7.44 |
| 5 | Nigina Sharipova (UZB) | 7.50 |
| 6 | Feng Lulu (CHN) | 7.53 |
| 7 | Lam On Ki (HKG) | 7.53 |
| 8 | Walentina Meredowa (TKM) | 7.58 |

==== 400 m ====
===== Round 1 =====
18 September

| Rank | Athlete | Time |
Heat 1
| 1 | Atchima Eng-chuan (THA) | 56.38 |
| 2 | Nguyễn Thị Hằng (VIE) | 56.45 |
| 3 | Kristina Pronzhenko (TJK) | 57.21 |
| 4 | Lee A-young (KOR) | 57.70 |
| 5 | Mariýa Rozymowa (TKM) | 58.28 |
| 6 | Serenia Ragatu (FIJ) | 59.82 |
Heat 2
| 1 | Supanich Poolkerd (THA) | 56.88 |
| 2 | Deng Changhong (CHN) | 59.39 |
| 3 | Aliya Boshnak (JOR) | 59.94 |
| 4 | Rabia Ashiq (PAK) | 1:08.57 |
| — | Hoàng Thị Ngọc (VIE) | DSQ |
Heat 3
| 1 | Elina Mikhina (KAZ) | 56.68 |
| 2 | Liang Yina (CHN) | 57.48 |
| 3 | Wang Jou-hsuan (TPE) | 59.29 |
| 4 | Najma Parveen (PAK) | 59.70 |
| 5 | Elenani Tinai (FIJ) | 59.78 |

===== Semifinals =====
18 September

| Rank | Athlete | Time |
Heat 1
| 1 | Atchima Eng-chuan (THA) | 56.03 |
| 2 | Nguyễn Thị Hằng (VIE) | 56.11 |
| 3 | Liang Yina (CHN) | 56.71 |
| 4 | Wang Jou-hsuan (TPE) | 57.63 |
| 5 | Aliya Boshnak (JOR) | 58.80 |
| 6 | Najma Parveen (PAK) | 59.74 |
Heat 2
| 1 | Elina Mikhina (KAZ) | 55.46 |
| 2 | Supanich Poolkerd (THA) | 56.21 |
| 3 | Kristina Pronzhenko (TJK) | 56.88 |
| 4 | Lee A-young (KOR) | 57.24 |
| 5 | Deng Changhong (CHN) | 59.04 |
| 6 | Mariýa Rozymowa (TKM) | 59.26 |

===== Final =====
19 September

| Rank | Athlete | Time |
|---|---|---|
| 1st place, gold medalist(s) | Elina Mikhina (KAZ) | 53.37 |
| 2nd place, silver medalist(s) | Nguyễn Thị Hằng (VIE) | 54.41 |
| 3rd place, bronze medalist(s) | Atchima Eng-chuan (THA) | 54.45 |
| 4 | Supanich Poolkerd (THA) | 55.85 |
| 5 | Liang Yina (CHN) | 56.32 |
| 6 | Kristina Pronzhenko (TJK) | 56.89 |

==== 800 m ====
===== Round 1 =====
18 September

| Rank | Athlete | Time |
Heat 1
| 1 | Gayanthika Abeyratne (SRI) | 2:12.93 |
| 2 | Arina Kleshchukova (KGZ) | 2:14.10 |
| 3 | Zulfizar Abdullaeva (UZB) | 2:17.39 |
| 4 | Lu Mengyao (CHN) | 2:22.31 |
| 5 | Sabina Sultanowa (TKM) | 2:33.81 |
Heat 2
| 1 | Zhang Guiping (CHN) | 2:15.87 |
| 2 | Gulshanoi Satarova (KGZ) | 2:16.37 |
| 3 | Park Na-yeon (KOR) | 2:16.78 |
| 4 | Rabia Ashiq (PAK) | 2:20.87 |
| 5 | Apinya Athiwet (THA) | 2:23.35 |
| 6 | Firýuza Taşpoladowa (TKM) | 2:26.15 |

===== Final =====
20 September

| Rank | Athlete | Time |
|---|---|---|
| 1st place, gold medalist(s) | Gayanthika Abeyratne (SRI) | 2:05.12 |
| 2nd place, silver medalist(s) | Zhang Guiping (CHN) | 2:07.65 |
| 3rd place, bronze medalist(s) | Arina Kleshchukova (KGZ) | 2:09.97 |
| 4 | Gulshanoi Satarova (KGZ) | 2:11.58 |
| 5 | Zulfizar Abdullaeva (UZB) | 2:12.76 |
| 6 | Park Na-yeon (KOR) | 2:14.20 |

==== 1500 m ====
19 September

| Rank | Athlete | Time |
|---|---|---|
| 1st place, gold medalist(s) | P. U. Chitra (IND) | 4:27.77 |
| 2nd place, silver medalist(s) | Gulshanoi Satarova (KGZ) | 4:31.64 |
| 3rd place, bronze medalist(s) | Arina Kleshchukova (KGZ) | 4:34.16 |
| 4 | Li Chunhui (CHN) | 4:41.07 |
| 5 | Zeng Ting (CHN) | 4:43.00 |
| 6 | Mekhrangez Nazarova (TJK) | 4:50.73 |
| 7 | Woraphan Nuanlsri (THA) | 4:51.42 |
| 8 | Sunisa Promsang (THA) | 4:57.91 |
| 9 | Sabrieh Maradat (JOR) | 5:03.69 |

==== 3000 m ====
18 September

| Rank | Athlete | Time |
|---|---|---|
| 1st place, gold medalist(s) | Alia Saeed Mohammed (UAE) | 9:25.03 |
| 2nd place, silver medalist(s) | Sanjivani Jadhav (IND) | 9:26.34 |
| 3rd place, bronze medalist(s) | Wang Jinyu (CHN) | 9:57.43 |
| 4 | Liu Fang (CHN) | 10:10.38 |
| 5 | Woraphan Nuanlsri (THA) | 10:15.23 |
| 6 | Gözel Çopanowa (TKM) | 10:24.96 |
| 7 | Sharon Firisua (SOL) | 10:28.34 |
| 8 | Suneeka Prichaprong (THA) | 10:35.56 |
| 9 | Mekhrangez Nazarova (TJK) | 10:41.50 |
| 10 | Sabrieh Maradat (JOR) | 10:48.68 |

==== 60 m hurdles ====
18 September

===== Round 1 =====
| Rank | Athlete | Time |
Heat 1
| 1 | Lui Lai Yiu (HKG) | 8.54 |
| 2 | Valentina Kibalnikova (UZB) | 8.67 |
| 3 | Suchada Meesri (THA) | 8.68 |
| 4 | Chen Jiexin (CHN) | 8.86 |
| 5 | Waleriýa Kagramanowa (TKM) | 10.31 |
| 6 | Reham Abdallah (JOR) | 10.76 |
Heat 2
| 1 | Anastassiya Vinogradova (KAZ) | 8.64 |
| 2 | Lin Ting-wei (TPE) | 9.01 |
| 3 | Yao Hui (CHN) | 9.11 |
| 4 | Maria Maratab (PAK) | 9.32 |
| 5 | Ýelena Rýabowa (TKM) | 9.47 |
| — | Rita Abdallah (JOR) | DNF |

===== Final =====
| Rank | Athlete | Time |
|---|---|---|
| 1st place, gold medalist(s) | Lui Lai Yiu (HKG) | 8.41 |
| 2nd place, silver medalist(s) | Suchada Meesri (THA) | 8.56 |
| 3rd place, bronze medalist(s) | Anastassiya Vinogradova (KAZ) | 8.59 |
| 4 | Valentina Kibalnikova (UZB) | 8.61 |
| 5 | Lin Ting-wei (TPE) | 9.01 |
| 6 | Yao Hui (CHN) | 9.10 |
| 7 | Maria Maratab (PAK) | 9.33 |
| 8 | Chen Jiexin (CHN) | 12.54 |

==== 4 × 400 m relay ====
20 September

| Rank | Team | Time |
|---|---|---|
| 1st place, gold medalist(s) | Thailand (THA) | 3:43.41 |
| 2nd place, silver medalist(s) | China (CHN) | 3:47.35 |
| 3rd place, bronze medalist(s) | Turkmenistan (TKM) | 3:50.39 |
| — | Jordan (JOR) | DSQ |
| — | Kazakhstan (KAZ) | DSQ |

==== High jump ====
18 September

| Rank | Athlete | Result |
|---|---|---|
| 1st place, gold medalist(s) | Nadiya Dusanova (UZB) | 1.86 |
| 2nd place, silver medalist(s) | Safina Sadullayeva (UZB) | 1.83 |
| 3rd place, bronze medalist(s) | Yeung Man Wai (HKG) | 1.83 |
| 4 | Wanida Boonwan (THA) | 1.79 |
| 5 | Dương Thị Việt Anh (VIE) | 1.75 |
| 6 | Seok Mi-jung (KOR) | 1.70 |
| — | Diana Khasawneh (JOR) | NM |

==== Long jump ====
18 September

| Rank | Athlete | Result |
|---|---|---|
| 1st place, gold medalist(s) | Olga Rypakova (KAZ) | 6.43 |
| 2nd place, silver medalist(s) | Bùi Thị Thu Thảo (VIE) | 6.36 |
| 3rd place, bronze medalist(s) | Neena Varakil (IND) | 6.04 |
| 4 | Gong Luying (CHN) | 5.99 |
| 5 | Marestella Sunang (PHI) | 5.97 |
| 6 | Yue Ya Xin (HKG) | 5.61 |
| 7 | Walentina Meredowa (TKM) | 5.58 |
| 8 | Chan Ka Sin (HKG) | 5.52 |
| 9 | Weronika Rus (TKM) | 5.07 |
| 10 | Noor Al-Qadi (JOR) | 4.93 |
| — | Hala Abdelrahim (JOR) | NM |
| — | Irina Ektova (KAZ) | NM |

==== Triple jump ====
19 September

| Rank | Athlete | Result |
|---|---|---|
| 1st place, gold medalist(s) | Olga Rypakova (KAZ) | 14.32 |
| 2nd place, silver medalist(s) | Mariya Ovchinnikova (KAZ) | 13.21 |
| 3rd place, bronze medalist(s) | Tan Qiujiao (CHN) | 13.10 |
| 4 | N. V. Sheena (IND) | 12.96 |
| 5 | Pan Youqi (CHN) | 12.91 |
| 6 | Parinya Chuaimaroeng (THA) | 12.87 |
| 7 | Vidusha Lakshani (SRI) | 12.51 |
| 8 | Maria Maratab (PAK) | 11.52 |
| 9 | Anna Belousowa (TKM) | 5.07 |
| 10 | Anna Kurbanýazowa (TKM) | 4.93 |
| — | Hala Abdelrahim (JOR) | NM |
| — | Al-Anoud Dabbas (JOR) | NM |

==== Shot put ====
20 September

| Rank | Athlete | Result |
|---|---|---|
| 1st place, gold medalist(s) | Bian Ka (CHN) | 17.34 |
| 2nd place, silver medalist(s) | Elena Smolyanova (UZB) | 15.60 |
| 3rd place, bronze medalist(s) | Lee Soo-jung (KOR) | 15.54 |
| 4 | Areerat Intadis (THA) | 14.70 |
| 5 | Tereapii Tapoki (COK) | 13.39 |
| 6 | Athima Saowaphaiboon (THA) | 13.09 |
| 7 | Zeenat Parveen (PAK) | 12.34 |
| 8 | Mereoni Bonasere (FIJ) | 12.34 |
| 9 | Ýulduzaý Kişikowa (TKM) | 10.98 |
| 10 | Aýna Mämmedowa (TKM) | 10.89 |
| 11 | Haneen Bani Bakkar (JOR) | 9.26 |

==== Pentathlon ====
18 September

| Rank | Athlete | 60M hurdles | High jump | Shot put | Long jump | 800M | Total |
|---|---|---|---|---|---|---|---|
| 1st place, gold medalist(s) | Purnima Hembram (IND) | 8.56; 1004 | 1.66; 806 | 11.52; 629 | 5.97; 840 | 2:22.98; 783 | 4062 |
| 2nd place, silver medalist(s) | Wassana Winatho (THA) | 8.78; 956 | 1.66; 806 | 11.02; 596 | 5.75; 774 | 2:22.99; 783 | 3915 |
| 3rd place, bronze medalist(s) | Sunisa Khotseemueang (THA) | 9.08; 893 | 1.72; 879 | 12.03; 663 | 5.92; 825 | 2:34.01; 643 | 3903 |
| 4 | Irina Welihanowa (TKM) | 9.00; 910 | 1.66; 806 | 11.75; 645 | 5.24; 626 | 2:21.72; 800 | 3676 |
| 5 | Sepideh Tavakkoli (IRI) | 9.42; 824 | 1.78; 953 | 11.75; 645 | 5.23; 623 | 2:33.69; 647 | 3547 |
| 6 | Aleksandra Yurkevskaya (UZB) | 9.19; 871 | 1.75; 916 | 10.44; 558 | 5.40; 671 | 2:33.09; 655 | 3535 |
| 7 | Olena Hudaýbergenowa (TKM) | 10.71; 585 | 1.60; 736 | 9.33; 486 | 4.90; 532 | 2:29.49; 699 | 3262 |
| — | Reham Abdallah (JOR) | 10.86; 560 | NM; 0 | DNS | | | DNF |
| — | Diana Khasawneh (JOR) | 11.13; 515 | NM; 0 | DNS | | | DNF |
| — | Kristina Pronzhenko (TJK) | DNF; 0 | DNS | | | | DNF |
