= Refugee Team at the 2017 Asian Indoor and Martial Arts Games =

- IOC code: ART
- Website: www.olympic.ph (in English)
- Competitors: 5 in 1 sport
- Medals: Gold 0 Silver 0 Bronze 0 Total 0

Asian Indoor and Martial Arts Games appearances
- 2017; 2021; 2026

The Refugee Team participated in the 2017 Asian Indoor and Martial Arts Games in Ashgabat, Turkmenistan from 17-27 September 2017.

== Background ==
The five athletes competed under the Olympic Council of Asia flag as the "Refugee Team". Three of the athletes competed at the 2016 Summer Olympics with the remaining two competing internationally for the first time. All athletes are from South Sudan with most of them from the Kakuma Refugee Camp in Kenya.

The organizers of the games invited the team to compete. Tegla Loroupe of Kenya will serve as the delegation's chef de mission.

== Participants ==
5 competitors competed in the Indoor Athletics under the flag of Refugee Team.

Sport	Men	Women	Total
Indoor Athletics	5	0	5

== See also ==
- Refugee Olympic Team at the 2016 Summer Olympics
- South Sudan at the 2016 Summer Olympics
