= Elena Smolyanova =

Uzbekistani shot putter

Personal information
- Born: February 16, 1986 (age 40) Tashkent Region, Uzbekistan
- Height: 1.76 m (5 ft 9 1/2 in)
- Weight: 80 kg (180 lb)

Sport
- Country: Uzbekistan
- Sport: Athletics
- Event: Shot put
Medal record
Women's athletics
Representing Uzbekistan
Asian Indoor Championships
Gold medal – first place	2018 Tehran	Shot put

Elena Aleksandrovna Smolyanova (Uzbek: Елена Александровна Смольянова; born 16 February 1986) is an Uzbekistani athlete specialising in the shot put. She competed for Uzbekistan in shot put at the 2012 Summer Olympics.

Her personal bests are 17.68 metres outdoors (Almaty 2012) and 15.60 metres indoors (Ashgabat 2017).

In 2019, she completed her sports career and went to serve in the National Guard of Uzbekistan.

== International competitions ==
Year	Competition	Venue	Position	Event	Notes
Representing Uzbekistan
2012	Olympic Games	London, United Kingdom	30th (q)	Shot put	14.43 m
2014	Asian Games	Incheon, South Korea	7th	Shot put	15.45 m
2017	Asian Indoor and Martial Arts Games	Ashgabat, Turkmenistan	2nd	Shot put	15.60 m
2018	Asian Indoor Championships	Tehran, Iran	1st	Shot put	15.54 m
2018	Asian Games	Jakarta, Indonesia	5th	Shot put	15.74 m
