= Bhutan at the 2017 Asian Indoor and Martial Arts Games =

- IOC code: BHU
- NOC: Bhutan Olympic Committee
- Website: bhutanolympiccommittee.org

in Ashgabat 17–27 September 2017
- Competitors: 12 in 1 sport
- Medals: Gold 0 Silver 0 Bronze 0 Total 0

Asian Indoor and Martial Arts Games appearances
- 2007; 2009; 2013; 2017; 2021; 2025

Bhutan competed at the 2017 Asian Indoor and Martial Arts Games held in Ashgabat, Turkmenistan. 12 athletes competed only in 1 sporting event, Taekwondo. Bhutan did not win any medal at the Games.

== Participants ==
Sport	Men	Women	Total
Taekwondo	7	5	12
