= 2017 World Youth Championships in Athletics – Girls' 400 metres =

The Girls' 400 metres at the 2017 World Youth Championships in Athletics was held on 12–14 July.

== Medalists ==
Gold	Silver	Bronze

== Records ==
Prior to the competition, the following records were as follows.

World Youth Best	Li Jing (CHN)	50.01	Shanghai, China	18 October 1997
Championship Record	Nawal El Jack (SUD)	51.19	Marrakesh, Morocco	15 July 2005
World Youth Leading	Arria Minor (USA)	52.05	Sacramento, United States	24 June 2017

== Heats ==
Qualification rule: first 3 of each heat (Q) and the next 4 fastest qualified.

Rank	Heat	Lane	Name	Nationality	Time	Notes
	1	2	Doneisha Anderson	Bahamas		
	1	3	Bianca Georgiana Anton	Romania		
	1	4	Maryam Mohebbi	Iran		
	1	5	Hana Amsalu	Ethiopia		
	1	6	Niddy Mingilishi	Zambia		
	1	7	Elena Georgieva	Bulgaria		
	2	2	Giovana Rosalia dos Santos	Brazil		
	2	3	Mary Moraa	Kenya		
	2	4	Wendira Moss	Bahamas		
	2	5	Katarina Sekulic	Serbia		
	2	6	Dandi Jyothika Sri	India		
	2	7	Aliya Boshnak	Jordan		
	3	1	Linda Philip Mamun	Athletes Refugee Team		
	3	2	Knowledga Omovoh	Nigeria		
	3	3	Milagros Durán	Dominican Republic		
	3	4	Liang Yina	China		
	3	5	Naledi Lopang	Botswana		
	3	6	Maria Scrob	Romania		
	3	7	Shaquena Foote	Jamaica		
	4	2	Maryana Shostak	Ukraine		
	4	3	Barbora Malíková	Czech Republic		
	4	4	Sharon Jebet	Kenya		
	4	5	Uwemedino Akpan Abasiono	Nigeria		
	4	6	Valery Montenegro	Venezuela		
	4	7	Laura Kaufmann	Germany		
	4	8	Johanna Bangala Ikabu	Democratic Republic of the Congo		
