= Tahiti at the 2017 Asian Indoor and Martial Arts Games =

- IOC code: TAH

in Ashgabat 17–27 September
- Competitors: 23 in 6 sports
- Medals: Gold 0 Silver 0 Bronze 0 Total 0

Asian Indoor and Martial Arts Games appearances
- 2017; 2021; 2025

Tahiti, which is a part of French Polynesia, competed in the 2017 Asian Indoor and Martial Arts Games on the behalf of French Polynesia which was held in Ashgabat, Turkmenistan.

Tahiti sent a delegation consisting of 23 competitors for the multi-sport event. The competitors couldn't receive any medal in the competition.

Tahiti made its first appearance in the Asian Indoor and Martial Arts Games for the first time (probably this was also the first instance where Tahiti as a separate nation competed in an international multi-sport event) along with other Oceania nations.

== Participants ==
| Sport | Men | Women | Total |
|---|---|---|---|
| Futsal | 12 | 0 | 12 |
| Taekwondo | 4 | 0 | 4 |
| Muaythai | 3 | 1 | 4 |
| Weightlifting | 0 | 1 | 1 |
| Wrestling | 1 | 0 | 1 |
| Ju Jitsu | 1 | 0 | 1 |
