= Athletics at the 1995 Summer Universiade – Men's 20 kilometres walk =

The men's 20 kilometres walk event at the 1995 Summer Universiade was held on 2 September in Fukuoka, Japan.

== Results ==
Rank	Athlete	Nationality	Time	Notes
1st place, gold medalist(s)	Daniel García	Mexico	1:24:11	
2nd place, silver medalist(s)	Giovanni Perricelli	Italy	1:24:19	
3rd place, bronze medalist(s)	Arturo Di Mezza	Italy	1:24:33	
4	Daisuke Ikeshima	Japan	1:24:52	
5	Tan Mingjun	China	1:25:09	
6	Wang Wei	China	1:25:27	
7	Toshihito Fujinohara	Japan	1:25:36	
8	Aleksandar Raković	Yugoslavia	1:26:59	
9	Dion Russell	Australia	1:27:21	
10	Dmitriy Yesipchuk	Russia	1:27:36	
11	Juan Antonio Porras	Spain	1:28:20	
12	Béla Breznai	Hungary	1:29:10	
13	Curt Clausen	United States	1:30:39	
14	Narinder Harbanssingh	Malaysia	1:31:16	
15	Timothy Seaman	United States	1:35:37	
16	Moeen Al-Khalaf	Jordan	1:40:53	NR
17	Saleumphol Sopraseuth	Laos	1:56:25	
	Andrey Makarov	Russia	DNF	
	Dmitriy Dolnikov	Russia	DNF	
