= Laos at the 2017 Asian Indoor and Martial Arts Games =

- IOC code: LAO
- NOC: National Olympic Committee of Lao

in Ashgabat 17–27 September
- Competitors: 1 in 1 sport
- Medals: Gold 0 Silver 0 Bronze 0 Total 0

Asian Indoor and Martial Arts Games appearances
- 2005; 2007; 2009; 2013; 2017; 2021; 2025

Laos competed at the 2017 Asian Indoor and Martial Arts Games held in Ashgabat, Turkmenistan from September 17 to 27. Laos sent the only competitor in the multi-sport event and the nation finished the competition without receiving any medals.

== Participants ==
Sport	Men	Women	Total
Taekwondo	1	0	1
