= Oman at the 2017 Asian Indoor and Martial Arts Games =

- IOC code: OMA
- NOC: Oman Olympic Committee

in Ashgabat 17–27 September
- Competitors: 5 in 2 sports
- Medals: Gold 0 Silver 0 Bronze 0 Total 0

Asian Indoor and Martial Arts Games appearances
- 2005; 2007; 2009; 2013; 2017; 2021; 2026

Oman competed at the 2017 Asian Indoor and Martial Arts Games held in Ashgabat, Turkmenistan from September 17 to 27. Oman sent a delegation consisting of 5 competitors in the event in 2 different sports.

Oman did not receive any medal at the Games.

== Participants ==
Sport	Men	Women	Total
Indoor Athletics	2	0	2
Tennis	0	3	3
