= Australia at the 2017 Asian Indoor and Martial Arts Games =

- IOC code: AUS
- NOC: Australian Olympic Committee
- Website: {{URL|example.com|optional display text}}

in Ashgabat 17–27 September
- Competitors: 17 in 3 sports
- Medals: Gold 0 Silver 0 Bronze 2 Total 2

Asian Indoor and Martial Arts Games appearances
- 2017; 2021; 2025

Australia competed at the 2017 Asian Indoor and Martial Arts Games held in Ashgabat, Turkmenistan from September 17 to 27. 17 athletes competed in 3 different sports.

Australia made its debut in an Asian Indoor and Martial Arts Games for the first time at the Games held in Turkmenistan along with other Oceania nations.

== Participants ==
Sport	Men	Women	Total
Taekwondo	3	3	6
Weightlifting	4	2	6
Wrestling	3	2	5

== Medallists ==
Medal	Name	Sport	Event
Bronze	Waterford Janice	Taekwondo	Women's 49 kg
Bronze	Ruth Tahere	Taekwondo	Women's 67 kg
