= Solomon Islands at the 2017 Asian Indoor and Martial Arts Games =

- IOC code: SOL
- NOC: National Olympic Committee of Solomon Islands
- Website: www.oceaniasport.com/solomon

in Ashgabat 17–27 September
- Competitors: 18 in 3 sports
- Medals Ranked 0th: Gold 0 Silver 0 Bronze 0 Total 0

Asian Indoor and Martial Arts Games appearances
- 2017; 2021; 2026

Solomon Islands competed at the 2017 Asian Indoor and Martial Arts Games in Ashgabat, Turkmenistan from September 17 to 27. Solomon Islands sent a delegation consisting of 18 competitors competing in 3 different sports, none of whom receive any medals.

Solomon Islands along with other Oceania nations competed in the Asian Indoor and Martial Arts Games for the first time in history.

== Participants ==
Sport	Men	Women	Total
Futsal	11	0	11
Weightlifting	2	2	4
Indoor Athletics	1	2	3
