= Sri Lanka at the 2017 Asian Indoor and Martial Arts Games =

- IOC code: SRI
- NOC: National Olympic Committee of Sri Lanka
- Website: www.srilankaolympic.org

in Ashgabat 17–27 September
- Competitors: 20 in 5 sports
- Medals Ranked 25th: Gold 1 Silver 2 Bronze 1 Total 4

Asian Indoor and Martial Arts Games appearances
- 2005; 2007; 2009; 2013; 2017; 2021; 2025

Sri Lanka competed at the 2017 Asian Indoor and Martial Arts Games in Ashgabat, Turkmenistan from 17 to 27 September 2017.

Sri Lanka finished on 26th place for winning the most medals among other nations at the 2017 Asian Indoor and Martial Arts Games.

== Participants ==
Sport	Men	Women	Total
Indoor Athletics	4	2	6
Wrestling	2	3	5
Chess	2	2	4
Weightlifting	3	0	3
Taekwondo	2	0	2

== Medallists ==
Medal	Name	Sport	Event
Gold	Gayanthika Abeyratne	Indoor Athletics	Women's 800 metres
Silver	Indunil Herath	Indoor Athletics	Men's 800 metres
Silver	Wijayalath Pedige	Indoor Athletics	Men's Long jump
Bronze	Manjula Kumara	Indoor Athletics	Men's High jump
