= Cambodia at the 2017 Asian Indoor and Martial Arts Games =

- IOC code: CAM
- NOC: National Olympic Committee of Cambodia
- Website: www.noccambodia.org

in Ashgabat 17–27 September
- Competitors: 2 in 1 sport
- Medals: Gold 0 Silver 0 Bronze 0 Total 0

Asian Indoor and Martial Arts Games appearances
- 2005; 2007; 2009; 2013; 2017; 2021; 2025

Cambodia competed at the 2017 Asian Indoor and Martial Arts Games held in Ashgabat, Turkmenistan. 2 athletes represented Cambodia at the Games in 1 sporting event. Cambodia didn't win any medal during the event.

== Participants ==
| Sport | Men | Women | Total |
|---|---|---|---|
| Dance sport | 1 | 1 | 2 |

== Dancesport ==
Cambodia participated in dancesport.

| Athlete | Event | Semifinal | | Final | |
| Athlete | Event | Points | Rank | Points | Rank |
|---|---|---|---|---|---|
| Chan Victor; Preap Daniella | Paso Doble | 29.750 | 6 Q | 30.175 | 6 |
| Chan Victor; Preap Daniella | Rumba | 29.668 | 5 Q | 30.166 | 5 |
