= Lee Jung-joon =

South Korean hurdler

Lee Jung-Joon
Personal information
- Nationality: South Korea
- Born: 26 March 1984 (age 42)
- Height: 1.85 m (6 ft 1 in)
- Weight: 78 kg (172 lb)

Korean name
- Hangul: 이정준
- RR: I Jeongjun
- MR: I Chŏngjun

Sport
- Sport: Athletics
- Event: 110 metres hurdles

Achievements and titles
- Personal best: 110 m hurdles: 13.53 s (2008)

Lee Jung-joon (Korean: 이정준; born March 26, 1984) is a South Korean sprint hurdler. He set both a national record and a personal best time of 13.53 seconds, by finishing second for the 110 metres hurdles at the 2008 Colorful Daegu Pre-Championships Meeting in Daegu.

Lee represented South Korea at the 2008 Summer Olympics in Beijing, where he competed for the men's 110 m hurdles, an event which was later dominated by Cuban athlete and world-record holder Dayron Robles. He ran in the second heat against seven other athletes, including United States' David Oliver, and Spain's Jackson Quiñónez, both of whom were heavy favorites in this event. He finished the race in fifth place by four hundredths of a second (0.04) ahead of Trinidad and Tobago's Mikel Thomas, with a time of 13.65 seconds. Although he was ranked below four mandatory slots, Lee qualified for the next phase of the competition based on his time and performance in the heats. Two days later, Lee, however, fell short in his bid for the semi-finals, as he placed sixth in the second heat of the quarterfinal rounds, with a national record-breaking time of 13.55 seconds.
