= Mehdi Eshaghi =

Iranian taekwondo athlete (born 1997)

Personal information
- Nationality: Iranian
- Born: November 4, 1997 (age 28) Karaj, Iran

Sport
- Country: Iran
- Sport: Taekwondo
- Team: Iran
Medal record
Representing Iran
Youth Olympic Games
Gold medal – first place	2014 Nanjing	-48kg
World Junior Championships
Gold medal – first place	2014 Chinese Taipei	-48kg

Mehdi Eshaghi (Persian: مهدی اسحاقی; born November 4, 1997) is an Iranian taekwondo athlete. Mehdi won the Gold medal of the World Junior Championships in Chinese Taipei in 2014 and also he achieved the Gold medal of the 2014 Summer Youth Olympics Games in Nanjing.

== Awards and honors ==
- Gold medal, 2014 Youth Olympic Games (Nanjing)
- Gold medal, 2014 World Junior Championships (Chinese Taipei)
- Silver medal, 2016 Asian Club Championships (UAE)
- Bronze medal, 2017 World Federation President's Cup (Uzbekistan)
- Gold medal, 2017 Islamic Solidarity Games (Azerbaijan)
- Gold medal, 2017 Martial Arts Games (Turkmenistan)
