= Tamara Armoush =

Jordanian athlete

Personal information
- Nationality: British
- Born: 8 May 1992 (age 34) Chesterfield, England
- Education: University of New Mexico
- Height: 1.73 m (5 ft 8 in)
- Weight: 54 kg (119 lb)

Sport
- Sport: Middle-distance running
- Event: 1500 metres
- College team: University of New Mexico Lobos
- Club: Birchfield Harriers

Tamara Armoush (born 8 May 1992) is a British-born middle-distance runner who now competes for Jordan. She competed in the women's 1500 metres at the 2017 World Championships in Athletics.
