= 2017 Asian Indoor and Martial Arts Games =

Multi-sport event in Ashgabat, Turkmenistan

V Asian Indoor and Martial Arts Games
- Host city: Ashgabat, Turkmenistan
- Motto: Health, Inspiration, Friendship (Turkmen: Sagdynlyk, Ruhubelentlik, Dostluk)
- Nations: 63
- Athletes: 4,012
- Events: 348 in 21 sports
- Opening: 17 September 2017
- Closing: 27 September 2017
- Opened by: Gurbanguly Berdimuhamedow; President of Turkmenistan
- Closed by: Ahmad Al-Fahad Al-Ahmed Al-Sabah; President of the Olympic Council of Asia
- Torch lighter: Pygy Baýramdurdyyew
- Ceremony venue: Olympic Stadium
- Website: ashgabat2017.com

The 2017 Asian Indoor and Martial Arts Games (Turkmen: Ýapyk binalarda we söweş sungaty boýunça V Aziýa oýunlary/Япык биналарда ве сөвеш сунгаты боюнча V Азия оюнлары), which is also counted as the 5th Asian Indoor Games, was held in Ashgabat, Turkmenistan in 2017. It became the third city in the former Soviet countries to win the right of hosting an Olympic Council of Asia-sanctioned event, following Astana and Almaty in Kazakhstan, which jointly-hosted the 2011 Asian Winter Games. The host city was chosen in Kuwait on 19 December 2010. On 6 July 2013 the flag of the Olympic Council of Asia was officially handed over to the mayor of the city of Ashgabat.

== Development and preparation ==
=== Venues ===
The Asian Indoor and Martial Arts Games were held at the Ashgabat Olympic Complex, which is a unique facility which has no parallel in Central Asia. The Complex boasts of over 30 structures, which also includes 15 competition venues, an Athletes' Village and a Paralympic Rehabilitation Medical Center. The construction was launched by the President of Turkmenistan Gurbanguly Berdimuhamedow. On November 5, 2010, the Turkmen President took part in the official stone laying ceremony for the Olympic Village. Investment in the first phase amounted to nearly $2 billion. The second phase of construction cost $3 billion. The total cost of the Olympic Village was $5 billion and the construction was carried by Turkish construction company Polimeks.

The Olympic village includes infrastructure design for the athletes and spectators, such as social and cultural centers, retails spaces, hotels, and dining facilities. The campus features pedestrian crossings and a monorails system for transport.

Several national higher educational institutions are located right next to the Olympic village. The Turkmen State Institute of Economics and Management, the Institute of Culture, the State Border Service Academy of Turkmenistan, and the National Institute of Sports and Tourism all have their campuses nearby. These universities will use the brand-new sports facilities built for the Games in the future.

Venue	Sports	Capacity
Olympic Stadium	Opening and closing ceremonies	45,000
Bowling Centre	Bowling	500
Chess Arena	Chess	500
Billiard Arena	Cue sports	1,000
Velodrome	Cycling	6,000
Taekwondo and Dancesport Arena	Dancesport, Taekwondo	1,000
Equestrian Centre	Equestrian	645
Ice Palace	Futsal	10,300
Indoor Athletics Arena	Indoor athletics	5,000
Tennis Centre	Indoor tennis	4,000
Muay and Ju-jitsu Arena	Ju-jitsu, Muaythai	861
Martial Arts Arena	Kickboxing, Kurash, Sambo	5,000
Aquatics Centre	Short course swimming	5,000
Weightlifting Arena	Weightlifting	861
Main Indoor Arena	Wrestling, Belt wrestling, Traditional wrestling	15,000

=== Test events ===
The Senior Asian Weightlifting Championship, the WAKO Asian Kickboxing Championships, and the Central Asian Short Course Swimming Championships took place concurrently as part of the Inspiring Ashgabat Test Event Series.

Weightlifting

The Senior Asian Weightlifting Championships competition began 23 April and ended on 29 April at the Weightlifting Arena. Athletes competed for 144 medals which were awarded for snatch, clean & jerk and total in each bodyweight category. Asia has a strong pedigree in weightlifting with 31 of the 45 medals at the Rio 2016 Olympics being awarded to Asian countries.

Kickboxing

The Martial Arts Arena hosted the Asian Kickboxing Championships between 26 and 30 April with athletes from up to 20 countries competing over the course of five days. The competition included 27 categories for men and 10 for women which were featured in the Ring and 28 categories for men and 16 for women on the Tatami. The event saw up to 354 medals awarded.

Short course swimming

In addition to these international competitions the Aquatics Federation of Turkmenistan have organised the first ever Central Asian Short Course Swimming Tournament which consisted of an invitational short course (25) competition in the new Indoor Aquatics Centre. Athletes from neighbouring countries Kazakhstan, Kyrgyzstan, Uzbekistan, Tajikistan, Iran and Afghanistan will be competed across a number of individual and relay events on 26–27 April 2017.

== The Games ==
=== Opening ceremony ===
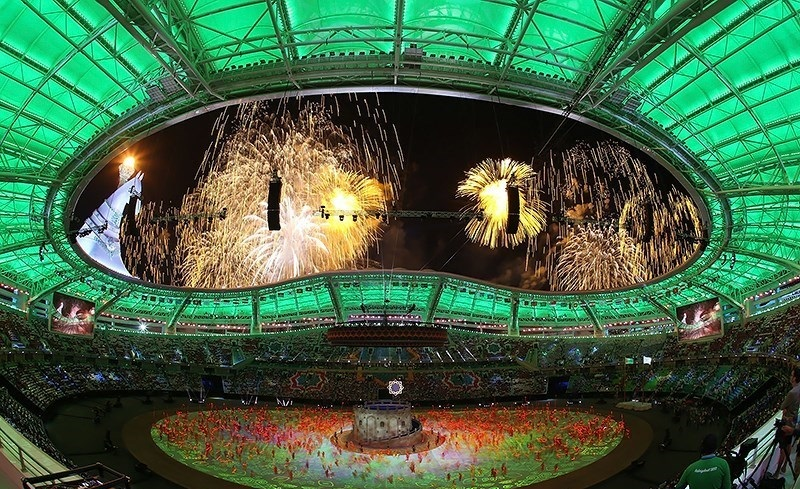
Opening Ceremony

The opening ceremony of the games took place on Sunday, 17 September 2017 at the newly built Olympic Stadium in Ashgabat. Turkmen president Gurbanguly Berdimuhamedow declared the Games open and Pygy Baýramdurdyyew lit the cauldron which built atop the Akhal-Teke horse head adorning the grandstand of the stadium.

=== Sports ===
A total of 21 sports are represented for the Indoor and Martial Arts Games: four Olympic sports (3-on-3 basketball, track cycling, weightlifting and olympic wrestling), seven Olympic sports held events only in non-Olympic formats (athletics, equestrian, football, swimming, taekwondo and tennis) and eleven non-Olympic disciplines and sports (bowling, chess, cue sports, dancesport, ju-jitsu, kickboxing, kurash, muaythai, sambo, belt wrestling and traditional wrestling)

Numbers in parentheses indicate the number of medal events contested in each sports discipline.

- 3x3 basketball (2)
- Belt wrestling
  - Alysh (24)
  - Belt wrestling (28)
  - Kazakh kuresi (3)
  - Pahlavani wrestling (3)
- Bowling (6)
- Chess (10)
- Cue sports (13)
- Dancesport (11)
- Equestrian (3)
- Futsal (2)
- Indoor athletics (25)
- Ju-jitsu (25)
- Kickboxing (15)
- Kurash (15)
- Muaythai (14)
- Sambo (23)
- Short course swimming (30)
- Taekwondo (18)
- Tennis (5)
- Track cycling (9)
- Turkmen goresh (26)
- Weightlifting (16)
- Wrestling (22)

Demonstration sports

- Esports (4) ()

=== Closing ceremony ===
The closing ceremony of the games took place on 27 September at the Olympic Stadium. There were live performances from international singers such Russian Nyusha, Lebanese Elissa, English John Newman and many other local musical performers.

== Participating National Olympic Committees ==
All 45 member countries of the Olympic Council of Asia were invited to compete at these Games. For the first time in any Asian Games event, countries part of the Oceania National Olympic Committees were invited, and were eligible for medals.

Participating National Olympic Committees

Olympic Council of Asia members

- Afghanistan (158)
- Bahrain (11)
- Bangladesh (12)
- Bhutan (9)
- Brunei (1)
- Cambodia (2)
- China (198)
- Chinese Taipei (99)
- Hong Kong (114)
- India (211)
- Indonesia (99)
- Iran (226)
- Iraq (52)
- Japan (60)
- Jordan (115)
- Kazakhstan (185)
- Kyrgyzstan (182)
- Laos (7)
- Lebanon (68)
- Macau (36)
- Malaysia (10)
- Maldives (38)
- Mongolia (71)
- Myanmar (1)
- Nepal (18)
- North Korea (1)
- Oman (5)
- Pakistan (107)
- Palestine (28)
- Philippines (121)
- Qatar (49)
- Saudi Arabia (55)
- Singapore (12)
- South Korea (71)
- Sri Lanka (21)
- Syria (35)
- Tajikistan (136)
- Thailand (246)
- Timor-Leste (1)
- Turkmenistan (493)
- United Arab Emirates (61)
- Uzbekistan (212)
- Vietnam (105)
- Yemen (6)
- Independent Olympic Athletes (2)
- Refugee Team (5)

Oceania National Olympic Committees members

- American Samoa (7)
- Australia (18)
- Cook Islands (11)
- Federated States of Micronesia (11)
- Fiji (28)
- Guam (34)
- Kiribati (13)
- Marshall Islands (10)
- Nauru (12)
- New Caledonia (2)
- Palau (10)
- Papua New Guinea (10)
- Samoa (16)
- Solomon Islands (19)
- Tahiti (23)
- Tonga (10)
- Tuvalu (8)
- Vanuatu (14)

== Calendar ==
In the following calendar for the 2017 Asian Indoor and Martial Arts Games, each blue box represents an event competition, such as a qualification round, on that day. The yellow boxes represent days during which medal-awarding finals for a sport were held, which numeric representing the number of finals that were contested on that day. On the left the calendar lists each sport with events held during the Games, and at the right how many gold medals were won in that sport. There is a key at the top of the calendar to aid the reader.

OC	Opening ceremony	●	Event competitions	1	Event finals	CC	Closing ceremony

September 2017		16th Sat	17th Sun	18th Mon	19th Tue	20th Wed	21st Thu	22nd Fri	23rd Sat	24th Sun	25th Mon	26th Tue	27th Wed	Gold medals
Ceremonies			OC										CC	
3x3 basketball					●	●	●	●	●	2				2
Belt wrestling	Alysh							12	12					24
Belt wrestling	Belt wrestling				14	14								28
Belt wrestling	Kazakh kuresi						3							3
Belt wrestling	Pahlavani wrestling						3							3
Bowling							1	1	1	1	●	●	2	6
Chess							●	●	●	2	●	4	4	10
Cue sports					●	1	1	3	1	2	2	3		13
Dancesport											6	5		11
Equestrian							2		1					3
Futsal		●	●	●	●	●	●		●	●	1	1		2
Indoor athletics				8	8	9								25
Ju-jitsu		10		7	8									25
Kickboxing									●	2	6	7		15
Kurash						3	6	6						15
Muaythai			●	●	●	●	14							14
Sambo										9	7	7		23
Short course swimming								8	7	8	7			30
Taekwondo				3	4	4	3	4						18
Tennis			●	●	●	●	●	●	●	●	1	3	1	5
Track cycling				1	●	1	1	3	3					9
Turkmen goresh		13		13										26
Weightlifting				2	2	2	2	2	2	2	2			16
Wrestling										6	8	8		22
Total gold medals		23	0	34	36	34	36	39	27	34	40	38	7	348
September 2017		16th Sat	17th Sun	18th Mon	19th Tue	20th Wed	21st Thu	22nd Fri	23rd Sat	24th Sun	25th Mon	26th Tue	27th Wed	Gold medals
Esports											●	2	2	4

== Medal table ==
* Host nation (Turkmenistan)

Rank	Nation	Gold	Silver	Bronze	Total
1	Turkmenistan (TKM)*	74	67	85	226
2	China (CHN)	42	32	23	97
3	Iran (IRI)	36	23	59	118
4	Kazakhstan (KAZ)	28	28	40	96
5	Uzbekistan (UZB)	24	33	74	131
6	Thailand (THA)	21	20	29	70
7	South Korea (KOR)	15	11	15	41
8	Vietnam (VIE)	13	8	19	40
9	Kyrgyzstan (KGZ)	12	20	37	69
10	Hong Kong (HKG)	10	11	14	35
11	India (IND)	9	12	19	40
12	Chinese Taipei (TPE)	9	7	12	28
13	Mongolia (MGL)	5	10	15	30
14	United Arab Emirates (UAE)	5	4	8	17
15	Qatar (QAT)	4	4	3	11
16	Iraq (IRQ)	4	3	6	13
17	Tajikistan (TJK)	3	14	34	51
18	Saudi Arabia (KSA)	3	5	2	10
19	Philippines (PHI)	2	14	14	30
20	Japan (JPN)	2	5	10	17
21	Indonesia (INA)	2	4	14	20
22	Pakistan (PAK)	2	3	16	21
23	Bahrain (BRN)	2	0	0	2
24	Jordan (JOR)	1	2	14	17
25	Sri Lanka (SRI)	1	2	1	4
26	Afghanistan (AFG)	1	1	10	12
27	Fiji (FIJ)	1	1	0	2
28	Syria (SYR)	1	0	5	6
29	Malaysia (MAS)	0	1	0	1
29	Marshall Islands (MHL)	0	1	0	1
31	Lebanon (LBN)	0	0	4	4
32	Australia (AUS)	0	0	2	2
33	Independent Olympic Athletes (IOA)	0	0	1	1
33	Macau (MAC)	0	0	1	1
33	Samoa (SAM)	0	0	1	1
33	Singapore (SGP)	0	0	1	1
Totals (36 entries)		332	346	588	1,266

== Doping ==
What follows is a list of all the athletes that have tested positive for a banned substance during the Games. Any medals listed were revoked.

Name	NOC	Sport	Banned substance	Medals	Ref
Dinara Hallyýewa	Turkmenistan	Alysh	Meldonium	(gold) (Women's classic style 65 kg); (silver) (Women's freestyle 65 kg)	
Dinara Hallyýewa	Turkmenistan	Belt wrestling	Meldonium	(gold) (Women's freestyle 65 kg); (bronze) (Women's classic style 65 kg)	
Dinara Hallyýewa	Turkmenistan	Turkmen goresh	Meldonium	(silver) (Women's freestyle 63 kg)	
Gülnar Haýytbaýewa	Turkmenistan	Alysh	Methylhexaneamine and 1,3-Dimethylbutylamine	(gold) (Women's freestyle 65 kg)	
Gülnar Haýytbaýewa	Turkmenistan	Belt wrestling	Methylhexaneamine and 1,3-Dimethylbutylamine	(gold) (Women's classic style 65 kg); (silver) (Women's freestyle 65 kg)	
Gülnar Haýytbaýewa	Turkmenistan	Turkmen goresh	Methylhexaneamine and 1,3-Dimethylbutylamine	(gold) (Women's freestyle 63 kg); (gold) (Women's classic style 63 kg)	
Nasiba Surkiýewa	Turkmenistan	Alysh	Methylhexaneamine and 1,3-Dimethylbutylamine	(gold) (Women's freestyle 75 kg)	
Nasiba Surkiýewa	Turkmenistan	Belt wrestling	Methylhexaneamine and 1,3-Dimethylbutylamine	(gold) (Women's freestyle 70 kg); (gold) (Women's classic style 70 kg)	
Nasiba Surkiýewa	Turkmenistan	Turkmen goresh	Methylhexaneamine and 1,3-Dimethylbutylamine	(gold) (Women's freestyle 70 kg); (gold) (Women's classic style 70 kg)	
Rejepaly Orazalyýew	Turkmenistan	Belt wrestling	Oxandrolone		
Rejepaly Orazalyýew	Turkmenistan	Turkmen goresh	Oxandrolone	(gold) (Men's freestyle +100 kg); (gold) (Men's classic style +100 kg)	
Ahmed Mansoor Shebeeb	Bahrain	Ju-jitsu	Mesterolone	(bronze) (Men's ne-waza 77 kg)	
Muhammet Altybaýew	Turkmenistan	Kickboxing	Meldonium and Luteinizing hormone	(gold) (Men's low kick 63.5 kg)	
Zhamalbek Asylbek Uulu	Kyrgyzstan	Sambo	Meldonium	(gold) (Men's sport 82 kg)	
Murgapgeldi Atdaýew	Turkmenistan	Turkmen goresh	Methylhexaneamine and 1,3-Dimethylbutylamine	(gold) (Men's classic style 90 kg)	
Ahmed Salah	Iraq	Wrestling	Methasterone		

== Marketing ==
=== Brand look ===
The brand look and all design related works of the Games were made by Belli Creative Studio.

=== Emblem ===
The emblem of the 2017 Asian Indoor and Martial Arts Games is the image of Akhal-teke, the national horse of Turkmenistan which is renowned for its speed, endurance and intelligence that represents Health. Surrounding the horse were the green Moon that represents Inspiration and the sun, the symbol of the Olympic Council of Asia, which represents friendship.

=== Mascot ===
"Wepaly" the Central Asian Shepherd Dog, the official mascot of the Games.

The 2017 Asian Indoor and Martial Arts Games mascot is a Central Asian Shepherd Dog named Wepaly – meaning loyal friend in Turkmen. Locally known as Alabai, the Central Asian Shepherd Dog is renowned as a courageous animal in Turkmenistan for many centuries has helped Turkmen shepherds to safeguard flocks of cattle in heavy conditions in the sandy desert. Wepaly wears traditional ceremonial dress and a white telpek fur hat while waving the State Flag of Turkmenistan and the symbol of the Olympic Council of Asia. The mascot was unveiled 200 days before the games and was originally coloured green, but Turkmenistan's president Gurbanguly Berdimuhamedow ordered a last minute makeover possibly due to poor public reception.

=== Medals ===
The medals of the 2017 Asian Indoor and Martial Arts Games were revealed on February 16, 2017, and were designed by Singaporean company Eng Leong Medallic Industries. The medals shaped like eight pointed Oguz Khan Stars, the national emblem of the host nation and featured elements like olive branches and the five traditional carpet motifs on its obverse and the games' emblem on its reverse. The olive branches symbolising peace, the country's neutrality status and its commitment to peaceful development of international relations, while the five traditional carpet motifs represent the provinces of the country and the traditionally warm Turkmen hospitality. A total of 2,000 medals were produced for the Games, weighing 721 kilograms all-together.

=== Corporate sponsorship ===
Sponsors of the 2017 Asian Indoor and Martial Arts Games
Official Partners
- Atos
- China National Petroleum Corporation
- Dragon Oil
- Hoşzaman
- Petronas
- Turkmenistan Airlines
- Turkmentelecom
Official Supporters
- Coca-Cola
- Dayhan Bank
- Halkbank
- Huawei
- Hyundai Engineering and Construction
- Kämil Market
- LG International
- Mastercard
- Senagat Bank
- State Bank for Foreign Economic Affairs of Turkmenistan
- State Development Bank of Turkmenistan
- Turkmen Ak Yol
- Turkmenistan Bank
- Turkmen Business Bank

== See also ==
- 2017 Asian Winter Games

Preceded by Incheon	Asian Indoor and Martial Arts Games; Ashgabat; V Asian Indoor and Martial Arts Games (2017)	Succeeded by Riyadh
