= Aliya Boshnak =

Jordanian sprinter

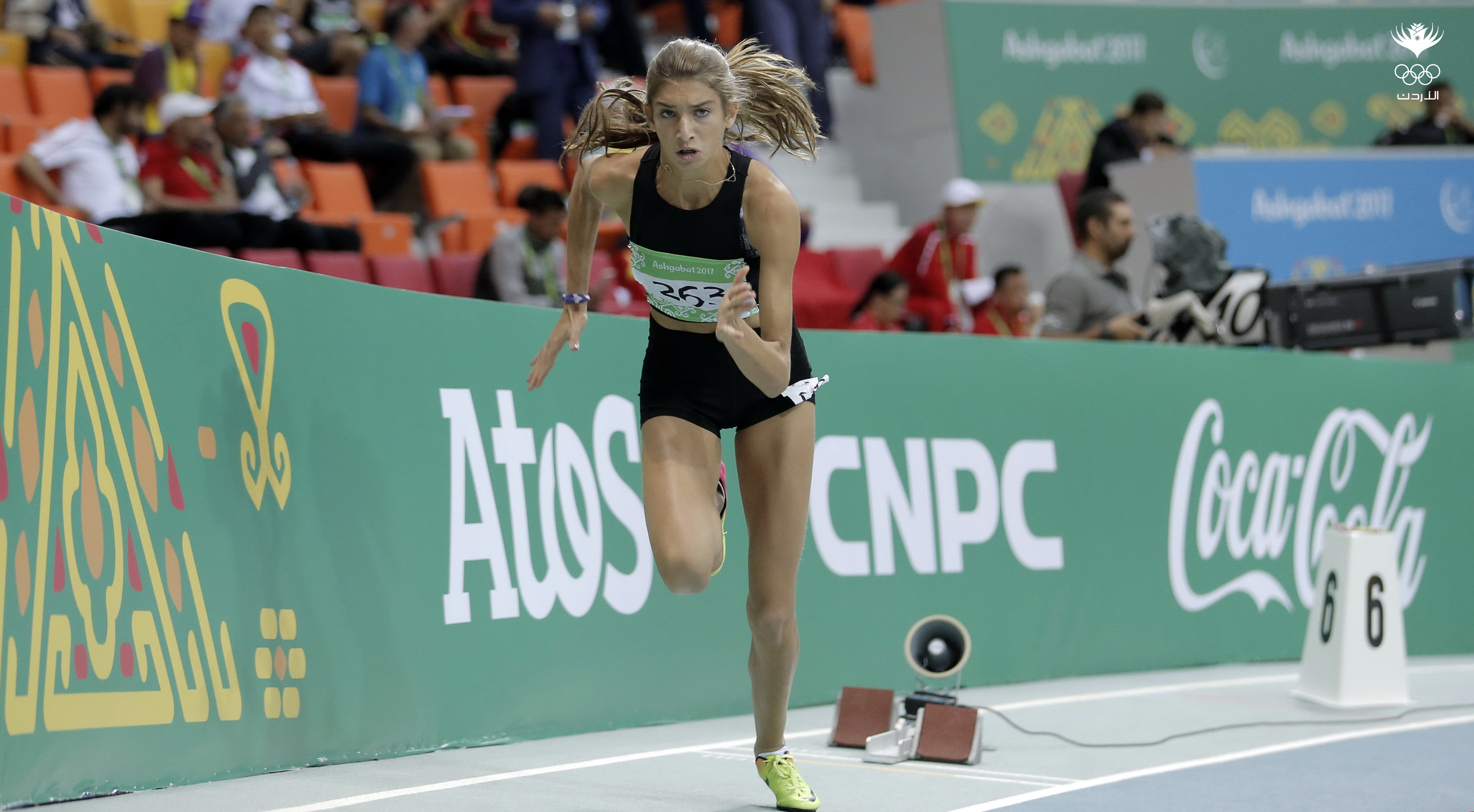
- Aliya Boshnak in 2017

Personal information
- Nationality: Jordan
- Born: 19 December 2000 (age 25)

Sport
- Sport: Athletics
- Event: 400 metres

Aliya Khattab Omar Boshnak (Arabic: عليا خطاب عمر بشناق; born 19 December 2000) is a Jordanian athlete of Bosniak descent. She started in 2012 and joined the Jordanian national team in 2015. She competed in 2021 in the Olympic Games (Tokyo 2020) as a universality slot. Boshnak is considered the first Jordanian athlete to qualify for the World Championships for juniors and girls in 2017, and she was crowned with two gold medals in the 200 and 400 meters races in the Arab Women's Championships.

She competed in the women's 400 metres event at the 2020 Summer Olympics. She currently runs Track and Field for Yale University.
