= 2022–23 UCI Track Cycling season =

International cycling contest

Details
- Dates: 22 October 2022 – 29 December 2023
- Location: World

The 2022–23 UCI Track Cycling season is the eighteenth season of the UCI Track Cycling Season. The 2022–23 season began on 22 October 2022 with the GP Norway and will end in December 2023, shifting the season change date from World Championship to year-end. It is organised by the Union Cycliste Internationale.

== Events ==
Event	Race	Winner	Second	Third	Ref
GP Norway; Norway 22 October 2022 CL2	Omnium	(Lithuania) Aivaras Mikutis	(Norway) Karsten Feldmann	(Norway) Anders Oddli	
GP Norway; Norway 22 October 2022 CL2	Omnium	(Norway) Anita Stenberg	(Barbados) Amber Joseph	(Norway) Nora Tveit	
GP Norway; Norway 22 October 2022 CL2	Women's Scratch	(Norway) Anita Stenberg	(Barbados) Amber Joseph	(Norway) Nora Tveit	
Stavanger Grand Prix; Norway 23 October 2022 CL2	Omnium	(Norway) Sondre Weiseth	(Norway) Sander Granberg	(Republic of Ireland) Andre Grennell	
Stavanger Grand Prix; Norway 23 October 2022 CL2	Omnium	(Norway) Anita Stenberg	(Denmark) Karoline Hemmsen	(Barbados) Amber Joseph	
Stavanger Grand Prix; Norway 23 October 2022 CL2	Men's Scratch	(Norway) Karsten Feldmann	(Lithuania) Justas Beniušis	(Republic of Ireland) Andre Grennell	
Caribbean Track Championships 2022; Trinidad and Tobago 11–13 November 2022 CL2	Keirin	(Trinidad and Tobago) Kwesi Browne	(Cuba) Tony García	(Jamaica) Lamin Wright	
Caribbean Track Championships 2022; Trinidad and Tobago 11–13 November 2022 CL2	Keirin	(Jamaica) Dahlia Palmer	(Suriname) Tachana Dalger	(Cuba) Claudia Baró	
Caribbean Track Championships 2022; Trinidad and Tobago 11–13 November 2022 CL2	Elimination Race	(Barbados) Jamol Eastmond	(Trinidad and Tobago) Kwesi Browne	(Trinidad and Tobago) Enrique de Comarmond	
Caribbean Track Championships 2022; Trinidad and Tobago 11–13 November 2022 CL2	Elimination Race	(Barbados) Amber Joseph	(Trinidad and Tobago) Alexi Ramirez	(Cuba) Daymelin Perez	
Caribbean Track Championships 2022; Trinidad and Tobago 11–13 November 2022 CL2	Sprint	(Trinidad and Tobago) Kwesi Browne	(Cuba) Bryan Pérez	(Trinidad and Tobago) Zion Pulido	
Caribbean Track Championships 2022; Trinidad and Tobago 11–13 November 2022 CL2	Sprint	(Jamaica) Dahlia Palmer	(Trinidad and Tobago) Phoebe Sandy	(Suriname) Tachana Dalger	
Caribbean Track Championships 2022; Trinidad and Tobago 11–13 November 2022 CL2	Omnium	(Cuba) Leandro Vidueiro	(Barbados) Edwin Sutherland	(Cuba) Carlos Hernández Moran	
Caribbean Track Championships 2022; Trinidad and Tobago 11–13 November 2022 CL2	Omnium	(Barbados) Amber Joseph	(Cuba) Daymelin Perez	(Trinidad and Tobago) Alexi Ramirez	
Caribbean Track Championships 2022; Trinidad and Tobago 11–13 November 2022 CL2	Scratch	(Barbados) Jamol Eastmond	(Trinidad and Tobago) Tariq Woods	(Trinidad and Tobago) Enrique de Comarmond	
Caribbean Track Championships 2022; Trinidad and Tobago 11–13 November 2022 CL2	Scratch	(Trinidad and Tobago) Alexi Ramirez	(Barbados) Amber Joseph	(Cuba) Claudia Baró	
Caribbean Track Championships 2022; Trinidad and Tobago 11–13 November 2022 CL2	Time Trial	(Trinidad and Tobago) Tariq Woods	(Cuba) Rolando Méndez Cairo	(Jamaica) Malik Reid	
Caribbean Track Championships 2022; Trinidad and Tobago 11–13 November 2022 CL2	Time Trial	(Suriname) Tachana Dalger	(Jamaica) Dahlia Palmer	(Trinidad and Tobago) Phoebe Sandy	
Caribbean Track Championships 2022; Trinidad and Tobago 11–13 November 2022 CL2	Men's Madison	Cuba (CUB); Alejandro Parra; Leandro Vidueiro	Barbados (BRB); Jamol Eastmond; Edwin Sutherland	Jamaica (JAM); Jerome Forrest; Andrew Ramsay	
Caribbean Track Championships 2022; Trinidad and Tobago 11–13 November 2022 CL2	Team Sprint	Trinidad and Tobago (TTO); Kwesi Browne; Zion Pulido; Ryan D'Abreau	Cuba (CUB); Bryan Pérez; Rolando Méndez Cairo; Tony García	Jamaica (JAM); Lamin Wright; Malik Reid; Zoe Boyd	
Caribbean Track Championships 2022; Trinidad and Tobago 11–13 November 2022 CL2	Team Sprint	Trinidad and Tobago (TTO); Alexi Ramirez; Phoebe Sandy; Adrianna Seyjagat			
Caribbean Track Championships 2022; Trinidad and Tobago 11–13 November 2022 CL2	Team Pursuit	Cuba (CUB); Leandro Vidueiro; Alejandro Parra; Douglas Vázquez; Carlos Hernández Moran	Trinidad and Tobago (TTO); Maurice Burnette; Enrique de Comarmond; Liam Trepte; Tariq Woods		
Caribbean Track Championships 2022; Trinidad and Tobago 11–13 November 2022 CL2	Team Pursuit	Cuba (CUB); Evelín Díaz; Daymelin Perez; Aylena Quevedo; Claudia Baró			
2022 UCI Track Champions League - Round 1 Spain 12 November 2022 TCL	Scratch	(United Kingdom) Mark Stewart	(Spain) Sebastián Mora	(Italy) Michele Scartezzini	
2022 UCI Track Champions League - Round 1 Spain 12 November 2022 TCL	Scratch	(United Kingdom) Katie Archibald	(Spain) Tania Calvo	(United States) Jennifer Valente	
2022 UCI Track Champions League - Round 1 Spain 12 November 2022 TCL	Keirin	(Netherlands) Harrie Lavreysen	(Germany) Stefan Bötticher	(Australia) Matthew Richardson	
2022 UCI Track Champions League - Round 1 Spain 12 November 2022 TCL	Keirin	(Colombia) Martha Bayona	(Canada) Kelsey Mitchell	(Germany) Lea Friedrich	
2022 UCI Track Champions League - Round 1 Spain 12 November 2022 TCL	Sprint	(Australia) Matthew Richardson	(Netherlands) Harrie Lavreysen	(Poland) Mateusz Rudyk	
2022 UCI Track Champions League - Round 1 Spain 12 November 2022 TCL	Sprint	(France) Mathilde Gros	(Netherlands) Hetty van de Wouw	(Ukraine) Olena Starikova	
2022 UCI Track Champions League - Round 1 Spain 12 November 2022 TCL	Elimination Race	(Canada) Mathias Guillemette	(United States) Gavin Hoover	(United Kingdom) Mark Stewart	
2022 UCI Track Champions League - Round 1 Spain 12 November 2022 TCL	Elimination Race	(Norway) Anita Stenberg	(United States) Jennifer Valente	(United States) Lily Williams	
TCL Points Race - Mallorca; Spain 12 November 2022 CL2	Points Race	(Switzerland) Claudio Imhof	(Spain) Sebastián Mora	(United Kingdom) William Perrett	
TCL Points Race - Mallorca; Spain 12 November 2022 CL2	Points Race	(United States) Jennifer Valente	(United States) Lily Williams	(United Kingdom) Katie Archibald	
Six Days of Ghent; Belgium 15–20 November 2022 CL1	Men's Madison	(Belgium) Lindsay De Vylder (Belgium) Robbe Ghys	(Belgium) Fabio Van den Bossche (Netherlands) Yoeri Havik	(Belgium) Iljo Keisse (Belgium) Jasper De Buyst	
Six Days of Ghent; Belgium 15–20 November 2022 CL1	Women's Points Race #1	(Belgium) Lotte Kopecky	(Netherlands) Marit Raaijmakers	(Belgium) Shari Bossuyt	
Six Days of Ghent; Belgium 15–20 November 2022 CL1	Women's Points Race #2	(Belgium) Lotte Kopecky	(Netherlands) Marit Raaijmakers	(Belgium) Shari Bossuyt	
Six Days of Ghent; Belgium 15–20 November 2022 CL1	Women's Elimination Race	(Belgium) Lotte Kopecky	(Netherlands) Marit Raaijmakers	(Netherlands) Babette van der Wolf	
Six Days of Ghent; Belgium 15–20 November 2022 CL1	Women's Scratch	(Netherlands) Marit Raaijmakers	(Netherlands) Daniek Hengeveld	(Belgium) Lotte Kopecky	
2022 UCI Track Champions League - Round 2 Germany 19 November 2022 TCL	Scratch	(United Kingdom) Oliver Wood	(Switzerland) Claudio Imhof	(Italy) Matteo Donegà	
2022 UCI Track Champions League - Round 2 Germany 19 November 2022 TCL	Scratch	(United Kingdom) Katie Archibald	(United States) Jennifer Valente	(Australia) Chloe Moran	
2022 UCI Track Champions League - Round 2 Germany 19 November 2022 TCL	Keirin	(Netherlands) Harrie Lavreysen	(Australia) Matthew Richardson	(Germany) Stefan Bötticher	
2022 UCI Track Champions League - Round 2 Germany 19 November 2022 TCL	Keirin	(Canada) Kelsey Mitchell	(Colombia) Martha Bayona	(Netherlands) Shanne Braspennincx	
2022 UCI Track Champions League - Round 2 Germany 19 November 2022 TCL	Sprint	(Australia) Matthew Richardson	(Netherlands) Harrie Lavreysen	(Colombia) Kevin Quintero	
2022 UCI Track Champions League - Round 2 Germany 19 November 2022 TCL	Sprint	(France) Mathilde Gros	(Netherlands) Laurine van Riessen	(Poland) Urszula Łoś	
2022 UCI Track Champions League - Round 2 Germany 19 November 2022 TCL	Elimination Race	(Canada) Dylan Bibic	(United Kingdom) William Perrett	(Canada) Mathias Guillemette	
2022 UCI Track Champions League - Round 2 Germany 19 November 2022 TCL	Elimination Race	(United Kingdom) Katie Archibald	(United States) Jennifer Valente	(United States) Lily Williams	
TCL Points Race - Berlin; Germany 19 November 2022 CL2	Points Race	(Switzerland) Claudio Imhof	(Spain) Sebastián Mora	(United States) Gavin Hoover	
TCL Points Race - Berlin; Germany 19 November 2022 CL2	Points Race	(United States) Jennifer Valente	(United States) Lily Williams	(Australia) Chloe Moran	
Grand Prix de la Commission des Vélodromes Romands; Switzerland 19 November 2022 CL2	Elimination Race	(Switzerland) Simon Vitzthum	(United States) Colby Lange	(United States) Peter Moore	
Grand Prix de la Commission des Vélodromes Romands; Switzerland 19 November 2022 CL2	Elimination Race	(Hong Kong) Lee Sze Wing	(Hong Kong) Leung Bo Yee	(Switzerland) Aline Seitz	
Grand Prix de la Commission des Vélodromes Romands; Switzerland 19 November 2022 CL2	Scratch	(Switzerland) Simon Vitzthum	(United States) Colby Lange	(Netherlands) Ryan Schilt	
Grand Prix de la Commission des Vélodromes Romands; Switzerland 19 November 2022 CL2	Scratch	(Hong Kong) Lee Sze Wing	(Switzerland) Aline Seitz	(Switzerland) Léna Mettraux	
Grand Prix de la Commission des Vélodromes Romands; Switzerland 19 November 2022 CL2	Madison	(United States) Colby Lange (United States) Peter Moore	(Switzerland) Simon Vitzthum (Switzerland) Justin Weder	(Netherlands) Alec Brigg (Netherlands) Ryan Schilt	
Grand Prix de la Commission des Vélodromes Romands; Switzerland 19 November 2022 CL2	Madison	(Hong Kong) Leung Bo Yee (Hong Kong) Lee Sze Wing	(Switzerland) Jasmin Liechti (Switzerland) Aline Seitz	(Switzerland) Léna Mettraux (Switzerland) Cybèle Schneider	
4 jours de Genève; Switzerland 24–27 November 2022 CL1	Scratch	(Switzerland) Simon Vitzthum	(United Kingdom) Dylan Hicks	(United States) Colby Lange	
4 jours de Genève; Switzerland 24–27 November 2022 CL1	Scratch	(Netherlands) Amber van der Hulst	(United Kingdom) Grace Lister	(United Kingdom) Maddie Leech	
4 jours de Genève; Switzerland 24–27 November 2022 CL1	Madison	(Switzerland) Simon Vitzthum (Switzerland) Lukas Rüegg	(France) Joseph Berlin-Sémon (Switzerland) Loïc Perizzolo	(United States) Peter Moore (United States) Colby Lange	
4 jours de Genève; Switzerland 24–27 November 2022 CL1	Madison	(United Kingdom) Maddie Leech (United Kingdom) Kate Richardson	(Netherlands) Amber van der Hulst (Netherlands) Marit Raaijmakers	(Switzerland) Léna Mettraux (Switzerland) Jasmin Liechti	
4 jours de Genève; Switzerland 24–27 November 2022 CL1	Points Race	(Netherlands) Yanne Dorenbos	(United States) Colby Lange	(Switzerland) Simon Vitzthum	
4 jours de Genève; Switzerland 24–27 November 2022 CL1	Points Race	(Netherlands) Marit Raaijmakers	(United Kingdom) Flora Perkins	(Netherlands) Amber van der Hulst	
4 jours de Genève; Switzerland 24–27 November 2022 CL1	Men's Elimination Race	(United Kingdom) Dylan Hicks	(Switzerland) Lukas Rüegg	(Switzerland) Simon Vitzthum	
4 jours de Genève; Switzerland 24–27 November 2022 CL1	Women's Omnium	(Netherlands) Marit Raaijmakers	(Netherlands) Amber van der Hulst	(United Kingdom) Maddie Leech	
2022 UCI Track Champions League - Round 3 France 26 November 2022 TCL	Scratch	(Spain) Sebastián Mora	(Switzerland) Claudio Imhof	(Italy) Matteo Donegà	
2022 UCI Track Champions League - Round 3 France 26 November 2022 TCL	Scratch	(United Kingdom) Sophie Lewis	(United Kingdom) Katie Archibald	(United States) Jennifer Valente	
2022 UCI Track Champions League - Round 3 France 26 November 2022 TCL	Keirin	(Australia) Matthew Richardson	(Netherlands) Harrie Lavreysen	(Japan) Shinji Nakano	
2022 UCI Track Champions League - Round 3 France 26 November 2022 TCL	Keirin	(Netherlands) Steffie van der Peet	(France) Mathilde Gros	(Canada) Kelsey Mitchell	
2022 UCI Track Champions League - Round 3 France 26 November 2022 TCL	Sprint	(Netherlands) Harrie Lavreysen	(Australia) Matthew Richardson	(Germany) Stefan Bötticher	
2022 UCI Track Champions League - Round 3 France 26 November 2022 TCL	Sprint	(France) Mathilde Gros	(Colombia) Martha Bayona	(Ukraine) Olena Starikova	
2022 UCI Track Champions League - Round 3 France 26 November 2022 TCL	Elimination Race	(United Kingdom) Oliver Wood	(Canada) Mathias Guillemette	(Switzerland) Claudio Imhof	
2022 UCI Track Champions League - Round 3 France 26 November 2022 TCL	Elimination Race	(United Kingdom) Katie Archibald	(United States) Jennifer Valente	(Canada) Maggie Coles-Lyster	
TCL Points Race - Paris; France 26 November 2022 CL2	Points Race	(United Kingdom) William Perrett	(Israel) Rotem Tene	(Spain) Sebastián Mora	
TCL Points Race - Paris; France 26 November 2022 CL2	Points Race	(United Kingdom) Katie Archibald	(United Kingdom) Sophie Lewis	(United States) Lily Williams	
2022 UCI Track Champions League - Round 4 United Kingdom 2 December 2022 TCL	Scratch	(United Kingdom) William Perrett	(Germany) Moritz Malcharek	(Canada) Dylan Bibic	
2022 UCI Track Champions League - Round 4 United Kingdom 2 December 2022 TCL	Scratch	(Republic of Ireland) Emily Kay	(United Kingdom) Katie Archibald	(Norway) Anita Stenberg	
2022 UCI Track Champions League - Round 4 United Kingdom 2 December 2022 TCL	Keirin	(Australia) Matthew Richardson	(Colombia) Santiago Ramírez	(Germany) Stefan Bötticher	
2022 UCI Track Champions League - Round 4 United Kingdom 2 December 2022 TCL	Keirin	(Netherlands) Steffie van der Peet	(Canada) Kelsey Mitchell	(Poland) Urszula Łoś	
2022 UCI Track Champions League - Round 4 United Kingdom 2 December 2022 TCL	Sprint	(Netherlands) Harrie Lavreysen	(Australia) Matthew Richardson	(Israel) Mikhail Iakovlev	
2022 UCI Track Champions League - Round 4 United Kingdom 2 December 2022 TCL	Sprint	(Ukraine) Olena Starikova	(France) Mathilde Gros	(Netherlands) Shanne Braspennincx	
2022 UCI Track Champions League - Round 4 United Kingdom 2 December 2022 TCL	Elimination Race	(United States) Gavin Hoover	(Canada) Mathias Guillemette	(Spain) Sebastián Mora	
2022 UCI Track Champions League - Round 4 United Kingdom 2 December 2022 TCL	Elimination Race	(United States) Jennifer Valente	(Norway) Anita Stenberg	(Canada) Maggie Coles-Lyster	
TCL Points Race - London; France 2 December 2022 CL2	Points Race	(United Kingdom) Mark Stewart	(United Kingdom) William Perrett	(Spain) Sebastián Mora	
TCL Points Race - London; France 2 December 2022 CL2	Points Race	(United Kingdom) Katie Archibald	(Canada) Maggie Coles-Lyster	(New Zealand) Michaela Drummond	
2022 UCI Track Champions League - Round 5 United Kingdom 3 December 2022 TCL	Scratch	(United Kingdom) Mark Stewart	(Netherlands) Matthijs Büchli	(United Kingdom) Oliver Wood	
2022 UCI Track Champions League - Round 5 United Kingdom 3 December 2022 TCL	Scratch	(Australia) Chloe Moran	(Canada) Sarah van Dam	(United Kingdom) Katie Archibald	
2022 UCI Track Champions League - Round 5 United Kingdom 3 December 2022 TCL	Keirin	(Australia) Matthew Richardson	(Netherlands) Harrie Lavreysen	(Germany) Stefan Bötticher	
2022 UCI Track Champions League - Round 5 United Kingdom 3 December 2022 TCL	Keirin	(Colombia) Martha Bayona	(Netherlands) Shanne Braspennincx	(Netherlands) Steffie van der Peet	
2022 UCI Track Champions League - Round 5 United Kingdom 3 December 2022 TCL	Sprint	(Netherlands) Harrie Lavreysen	(Australia) Matthew Richardson	(Germany) Stefan Bötticher	
2022 UCI Track Champions League - Round 5 United Kingdom 3 December 2022 TCL	Sprint	(France) Mathilde Gros	(Canada) Kelsey Mitchell	(Colombia) Martha Bayona	
2022 UCI Track Champions League - Round 5 United Kingdom 3 December 2022 TCL	Elimination Race	(United Kingdom) Oliver Wood	(Switzerland) Claudio Imhof	(Netherlands) Matthijs Büchli	
2022 UCI Track Champions League - Round 5 United Kingdom 3 December 2022 TCL	Elimination Race	(United Kingdom) Katie Archibald	(United States) Jennifer Valente	(Canada) Maggie Coles-Lyster	
Six Days of Rotterdam; Netherlands 6–11 December 2022 CL2	Men's Madison	(Belgium) Lindsay De Vylder (Belgium) Jules Hesters	(Netherlands) Niki Terpstra (Netherlands) Yoeri Havik	(Italy) Elia Viviani (Netherlands) Vincent Hoppezak	
MNCF President's Cup I Malaysia 7 December 2022 CL2	Keirin	(New Zealand) Sam Dakin	(Malaysia) Azizulhasni Awang	(Malaysia) Muhammad Shah Firdaus Sahrom	
MNCF President's Cup I Malaysia 7 December 2022 CL2	Keirin	(Hong Kong) Yeung Cho-yiu	(Hong Kong) Ching Yin Shan	(Indonesia) Ratu Afifah Nur Indah	
MNCF President's Cup I Malaysia 7 December 2022 CL2	Omnium	(Malaysia) Abdul Azim Aliyas	(Indonesia) Bernard Van Aert	(Hong Kong) Mow Ching Yin	
MNCF President's Cup I Malaysia 7 December 2022 CL2	Omnium	(Hong Kong) Lee Sze Wing	(Hong Kong) Leung Bo Yee	(Malaysia) Nur Aisyah Mohamad Zubir	
MNCF President's Cup I Malaysia 7 December 2022 CL2	Sprint	(New Zealand) Sam Dakin	(Malaysia) Muhammad Shah Firdaus Sahrom	(Malaysia) Fadhil Zonis	
MNCF President's Cup I Malaysia 7 December 2022 CL2	Sprint	(Hong Kong) Yeung Cho-yiu	(Malaysia) Anis Rosidi	(Hong Kong) Sze Wing Ng	
MNCF President's Cup II; Malaysia 8 December 2022 CL2	Keirin	(New Zealand) Sam Dakin	(Malaysia) Azizulhasni Awang	(Malaysia) Akmal Nazimi	
MNCF President's Cup II; Malaysia 8 December 2022 CL2	Keirin	(Malaysia) Anis Rosidi	(Hong Kong) Ching Yin Shan	(Malaysia) Ann Yii Yong	
MNCF President's Cup II; Malaysia 8 December 2022 CL2	Omnium	(Malaysia) Chun Kiat Lim	(Indonesia) Bernard Van Aert	(Malaysia) Nur Aiman Rosli	
MNCF President's Cup II; Malaysia 8 December 2022 CL2	Omnium	(Hong Kong) Leung Bo Yee	(Indonesia) Ayustina Delia Priatna	(Malaysia) Ci Hui Nyo	
MNCF President's Cup II; Malaysia 8 December 2022 CL2	Scratch	(Indonesia) Terry Yudha Kusuma	(Malaysia) Abdul Azim Aliyas	(Malaysia) Mohamad Saari Amri Abd Rasim	
MNCF President's Cup II; Malaysia 8 December 2022 CL2	Scratch	(Hong Kong) Lee Sze Wing	(Hong Kong) Phoebe Tung	(Indonesia) Ayustina Delia Priatna	
MNCF President's Cup II; Malaysia 8 December 2022 CL2	Sprint	(New Zealand) Sam Dakin	(Malaysia) Muhammad Shah Firdaus Sahrom	(Malaysia) Muhammad Ridwan Sahrom	
MNCF President's Cup II; Malaysia 8 December 2022 CL2	Sprint	(Malaysia) Anis Rosidi	(Malaysia) Nurul Izzah Izzati Mohd Asri	(Hong Kong) Yeung Cho-yiu	
Sydney 1000; Australia 10 December 2022 CL2	Sprint	(New Zealand) Sam Dakin	(Australia) Byron Davies	(Australia) Sam Gallagher	
Sydney 1000; Australia 10 December 2022 CL2	Sprint	(New Zealand) Ellesse Andrews	(New Zealand) Rebecca Petch	(United States) Madalyn Godby	
Sydney 1000; Australia 10 December 2022 CL2	Omnium	(Australia) Kurt Eather	(Australia) Cameron Rogers	(United States) Lance Abshire	
Sydney 1000; Australia 10 December 2022 CL2	Omnium	(Australia) Keira Will	(Australia) Tahlia Dole	(South Africa) Kerry Jonker	
Sydney 1000; Australia 10 December 2022 CL2	Keirin	(Australia) Sam Gallagher	(New Zealand) Sam Dakin	(Australia) Byron Davies	
Sydney 1000; Australia 10 December 2022 CL2	Keirin	(New Zealand) Ellesse Andrews	(Australia) Selina Ho	(United States) Madalyn Godby	
Indonesia Cup 2022; Indonesia 15–17 December 2022 CL2	Keirin	(Indonesia) Dika Alif Dhentaka	(Indonesia) Syarif Hidayatullah	(Malaysia) Yong Kiat Khow	
Indonesia Cup 2022; Indonesia 15–17 December 2022 CL2	Keirin	(Indonesia) Wiji Lestari	(Russia) Elizaveta Asseserova	(Indonesia) Ratu Afifah Nur Indah	
Indonesia Cup 2022; Indonesia 15–17 December 2022 CL2	Men's Madison	(Indonesia) Terry Yudha Kusuma (Indonesia) Bernard Van Aert	(Indonesia) Dealton Prayogo (Indonesia) Yosandy Oetomo	(Malaysia) Yong Kiat Khow (Malaysia) Muhammad Amir Farhan Haizeman	
Indonesia Cup 2022; Indonesia 15–17 December 2022 CL2	Omnium	(Indonesia) Bernard Van Aert	(Indonesia) Yosandy Oetomo	(Indonesia) Dealton Prayogo	
Indonesia Cup 2022; Indonesia 15–17 December 2022 CL2	Omnium	(Indonesia) Ayustina Delia Priatna	(Indonesia) Dewika Mulya Sova	(Indonesia) Liontin Evangelina Setiawan	
Indonesia Cup 2022; Indonesia 15–17 December 2022 CL2	Scratch	(Indonesia) Terry Yudha Kusuma	(Indonesia) Dealton Prayogo	(Indonesia) Bernard Van Aert	
Indonesia Cup 2022; Indonesia 15–17 December 2022 CL2	Scratch	(Indonesia) Liontin Evangelina Setiawan	(Indonesia) Dewika Mulya Sova	(Indonesia) Ayustina Delia Priatna	
Indonesia Cup 2022; Indonesia 15–17 December 2022 CL2	Men's Team Pursuit	Indonesia (INA) I Dealton Prayogo; Terry Yudha Kusuma; Yosandy Oetomo; Bernard Van Aert	Indonesia (INA) II; Rifyal Nur Hasyifa; Widodo Slamet; Shindu Ardiyanto; Surya Pranata		
Indonesia Cup 2022; Indonesia 15–17 December 2022 CL2	Sprint	(Indonesia) Dika Alif Dhentaka	(Malaysia) Yong Kiat Khow	(Indonesia) Fandi Jolata	
Indonesia Cup 2022; Indonesia 15–17 December 2022 CL2	Sprint	(Indonesia) Ratu Afifah Nur Indah	(Indonesia) Wiji Lestari	(Russia) Elizaveta Asseserova	
Track Cycling Challenge; Switzerland 16–17 December 2022 CL1	Elimination Race	(Denmark) Tobias Hansen	(United States) Colby Lange	(United Kingdom) Finlay Pickering	
Track Cycling Challenge; Switzerland 16–17 December 2022 CL1	Elimination Race	(United Kingdom) Katie Archibald	(Italy) Martina Fidanza	(Italy) Silvia Zanardi	
Track Cycling Challenge; Switzerland 16–17 December 2022 CL1	Madison	(United Kingdom) Ethan Vernon (United Kingdom) William Tidball	(Germany) Roger Kluge (Germany) Theo Reinhardt	(Switzerland) Claudio Imhof (Switzerland) Simon Vitzthum	
Track Cycling Challenge; Switzerland 16–17 December 2022 CL1	Madison	(United Kingdom) Katie Archibald (United Kingdom) Neah Evans	(Italy) Silvia Zanardi (Italy) Martina Fidanza	(Denmark) Amalie Dideriksen (Denmark) Julie Leth	
Track Cycling Challenge; Switzerland 16–17 December 2022 CL1	Keirin	(Thailand) Jai Angsuthasawit	(Germany) Maximilian Dörnbach	(Canada) Ryan Dodyk	
Track Cycling Challenge; Switzerland 16–17 December 2022 CL1	Keirin	(Poland) Paulina Petri	(Poland) Nikola Sibiak	(Canada) Jackie Boyle	
Track Cycling Challenge; Switzerland 16–17 December 2022 CL1	Scratch	(Netherlands) Yanne Dorenbos	(Denmark) Tobias Hansen	(United Kingdom) Finlay Pickering	
Track Cycling Challenge; Switzerland 16–17 December 2022 CL1	Scratch	(United Kingdom) Sophie Lewis	(Italy) Silvia Zanardi	(Poland) Karolina Karasiewicz	
Track Cycling Challenge; Switzerland 16–17 December 2022 CL1	Omnium	(United Kingdom) Katie Archibald	(Italy) Martina Fidanza	(United Kingdom) Neah Evans	
Track Cycling Challenge; Switzerland 16–17 December 2022 CL1	Omnium	(Netherlands) Yanne Dorenbos	(Germany) Roger Kluge	(United Kingdom) Ethan Vernon	
Track Cycling Challenge; Switzerland 16–17 December 2022 CL1	Sprint	(Canada) Nick Wammes	(Germany) Maximilian Dörnbach	(Canada) Ryan Dodyk	
Track Cycling Challenge; Switzerland 16–17 December 2022 CL1	Sprint	(Italy) Miriam Vece	(Poland) Urszula Łoś	(Republic of Ireland) Orla Walsh	
Track Cycling Challenge; Switzerland 16–17 December 2022 CL1	Points Race	(United States) Colby Lange	(Switzerland) Simon Vitzthum	(Italy) Mattia Pinazzi	
Track Cycling Challenge; Switzerland 16–17 December 2022 CL1	Points Race	(United Kingdom) Neah Evans	(Italy) Silvia Zanardi	(United Kingdom) Katie Archibald	
Austral Wheelrace; Australia 17 December 2022 CL1	Sprint	(Malaysia) Azizulhasni Awang	(Australia) Thomas Cornish	(Australia) James Brister	
Austral Wheelrace; Australia 17 December 2022 CL1	Sprint	(New Zealand) Ellesse Andrews	(Australia) Alessia McCaig	(Australia) Breanna Hargrave	
Austral Wheelrace; Australia 17 December 2022 CL1	Keirin	(Australia) James Brister	(Malaysia) Azizulhasni Awang	(Australia) Daniel Barber	
Austral Wheelrace; Australia 17 December 2022 CL1	Keirin	(New Zealand) Ellesse Andrews	(New Zealand) Rebecca Petch	(United States) Madalyn Godby	
Troféu Internacional de Pista - José Bento Pessoa; Portugal 17 December 2022 CL2	Men's Sprint	(Lithuania) Vasilijus Lendel	(France) Luca Priore	(France) Timmy Gillion	
Troféu Internacional de Pista - José Bento Pessoa; Portugal 17 December 2022 CL2	Men's Keirin	(Lithuania) Vasilijus Lendel	(Spain) Alejandro Martínez	(France) Luca Priore	
Troféu Internacional de Pista - José Bento Pessoa; Portugal 17 December 2022 CL2	Men's Madison	(Portugal) João Matias (Portugal) Diogo Narciso	(Portugal) Rodrigo Caixas (Portugal) Daniel Días	(Austria) Raphael Kokas (Austria) Tim Wafler	
Troféu Internacional de Pista - José Bento Pessoa; Portugal 17 December 2022 CL2	Omnium	(Portugal) João Matias	(Portugal) Daniel Días	(Spain) Xabier Azparren	
Troféu Internacional de Pista - José Bento Pessoa; Portugal 17 December 2022 CL2	Omnium	(Portugal) Maria Martins	(Spain) Eukene Larrarte	(Mexico) Lizbeth Salazar	
Troféu Internacional de Pista - Alves Barbosa; Portugal 18 December 2022 CL2	Madison	(Portugal) João Matias (Portugal) Diogo Narciso	(Portugal) Rodrigo Caixas (Portugal) Daniel Días	(Spain) Marc Terrasa (Spain) Francesc Bennassar	
Troféu Internacional de Pista - Alves Barbosa; Portugal 18 December 2022 CL2	Madison	(Republic of Ireland) Lara Gillespie (Republic of Ireland) Mia Griffin	(Spain) Laura Rodríguez (Spain) Eukene Larrarte	(Spain) Saioa Orgambide (Spain) Ana Estella	
Troféu Internacional de Pista - Alves Barbosa; Portugal 18 December 2022 CL2	Men's Sprint	(Lithuania) Vasilijus Lendel	(France) Luca Priore	(France) Timmy Gillion	
Troféu Internacional de Pista - Alves Barbosa; Portugal 18 December 2022 CL2	Men's Keirin	(Italy) Stefano Moro	(Italy) Matteo Bianchi	(Greece) Sotirios Bretas	
Troféu Internacional de Pista - Alves Barbosa; Portugal 18 December 2022 CL2	Omnium	(Portugal) João Matias	(Republic of Ireland) JB Murphy	(Portugal) Daniel Días	
Troféu Internacional de Pista - Alves Barbosa; Portugal 18 December 2022 CL2	Omnium	(Republic of Ireland) Lara Gillespie	(Portugal) Maria Martins	(Spain) Eukene Larrarte	
2022 TasCarnivals: Launceston; Australia 28 December 2022 CL2	Omnium	(Australia) Graeme Frislie	(Netherlands) Roy Eefting	(Austria) Paul Buschek	
2022 TasCarnivals: Launceston; Australia 28 December 2022 CL2	Omnium	(Australia) Lauren Perry	(Malaysia) Nur Aisyah Mohamad Zubir	(Czech Republic) Hana Hermanovská	
2022 TasCarnivals: Launceston; Australia 28 December 2022 CL2	Keirin	(Australia) Sam Gallagher	(New Zealand) Kaio Lart	(United States) Erin Young	
2022 TasCarnivals: Launceston; Australia 28 December 2022 CL2	Keirin	(Australia) Kristina Clonan	(Canada) Lizanne Wilmot	(Australia) Selina Ho	
100 km Madison; Denmark 28 December 2022 CL2	Men's Madison	(Netherlands) Yoeri Havik (Netherlands) Dylan van Baarle	(Germany) Theo Reinhardt (Germany) Roger Kluge	(Denmark) Lasse Norman Hansen (Denmark) Michael Mørkøv	
Grand Prix Novo Mesto Slovenia; Slovenia 28 & 29 December 2022 CL2	Points Race	(Hungary) Bertold Drijver	(Austria) Daniel Auer	(Hungary) Viktor Filutás	
Grand Prix Novo Mesto Slovenia; Slovenia 28 & 29 December 2022 CL2	Points Race	(Hungary) Johanna Borissza			
Grand Prix Novo Mesto Slovenia; Slovenia 28 & 29 December 2022 CL2	Men's Madison	(Hungary) Bertold Drijver (Hungary) Viktor Filutás	(Slovenia) Matevž Govekar (Slovenia) Erazem Valjavec	(Czech Republic) Adam Křenek (Czech Republic) Štěpán Široký	
Grand Prix Odense; Denmark 29 December 2022 CL2	Madison	(Denmark) Lasse Norman Hansen (Denmark) Tobias Hansen	(Netherlands) Vincent Hoppezak (Netherlands) Maikel Zijlaard	(Denmark) Rasmus Bøgh Wallin (Denmark) Tobias Kongstad	
Grand Prix Odense; Denmark 29 December 2022 CL2	Madison	(Denmark) Amalie Winther Olsen (Italy) Francesca Selva	(Italy) Matilde Vitillo (Italy) Silvia Zanardi	(Switzerland) Michelle Andres (Norway) Nora Tveit	
2022 TasCarnivals: Devonport; Australia 29 December 2022 CL2	Elimination Race	(Australia) Graeme Frislie	(Austria) Paul Buschek	(Australia) Stephen Hall	
2022 TasCarnivals: Devonport; Australia 29 December 2022 CL2	Elimination Race	(Australia) Lauren Perry	(Malaysia) Ci Hui Nyo	(Australia) Sophie Marr	
2022 TasCarnivals: Devonport; Australia 29 December 2022 CL2	Keirin	(Australia) Sam Gallagher	(New Zealand) Kaio Lart	(United States) Erin Young	
2022 TasCarnivals: Devonport; Australia 29 December 2022 CL2	Keirin	(Australia) Kristina Clonan	(Australia) Lauren Perry	(Canada) Lizanne Wilmot	
2022 TasCarnivals: Devonport; Australia 29 December 2022 CL2	Scratch	(Australia) Joshua Duffy	(Austria) Maximilian Schmidbauer	(Netherlands) Roy Eefting	
2022 TasCarnivals: Devonport; Australia 29 December 2022 CL2	Scratch	(Australia) Lauren Perry	(Australia) Sophie Marr	(Australia) Selina Ho	
2022 TasCarnivals Launceston; Australia 30 December 2022 CL2	Elimination Race	(Australia) Graeme Frislie	(Australia) Joshua Duffy	(Malaysia) Abdul Azim Aliyas	
2022 TasCarnivals Launceston; Australia 30 December 2022 CL2	Elimination Race	(Australia) Lauren Perry	(Czech Republic) Hana Hermanovská	(Malaysia) Nur Aisyah Mohamad Zubir	
2022 TasCarnivals: Burnie; Australia 31 December 2022 CL2	Elimination Race	(Australia) Graeme Frislie	(Austria) Maximilian Schmidbauer	(Australia) Stephen Hall	
2022 TasCarnivals: Burnie; Australia 31 December 2022 CL2	Elimination Race	(Australia) Lauren Perry	(Malaysia) Ci Hui Nyo	(Australia) Belinda Bailey	
2022 TasCarnivals: Burnie; Australia 31 December 2022 CL2	Keirin	(Australia) Sam Gallagher	(New Zealand) Reuben Webster	(Australia) Adam Lees	
2022 TasCarnivals: Burnie; Australia 31 December 2022 CL2	Keirin	(Australia) Kristina Clonan	(Australia) Lauren Perry	(Australia) Emma Stevens	
2022 TasCarnivals: Burnie; Australia 31 December 2022 CL2	Scratch	(Netherlands) Roy Eefting	(Australia) Dalton Stretton	(Malaysia) Abdul Azim Aliyas	
2022 TasCarnivals: Burnie; Australia 31 December 2022 CL2	Scratch	(Australia) Lauren Perry	(Malaysia) Nur Aisyah Mohamad Zubir	(Czech Republic) Hana Hermanovská	
China Track International Event I China 3 January 2023 CL2	Keirin	(China) Qi Liu	(China) Chenxi Xue	(Hong Kong) Tsz Chun Mok	
China Track International Event I China 3 January 2023 CL2	Keirin	(China) Yuan Liying	(China) Tong Mengqi	(Hong Kong) Sze Wing Ng	
China Track International Event I China 3 January 2023 CL2	Madison	(Hong Kong) Leung Chun Wing (Hong Kong) Tsun Wai Chu	(China) Junjie Wu (China) Haojun Hu	(Hong Kong) Mow Ching Yin (Hong Kong) Wan Yau Vincent Lau	
China Track International Event I China 3 January 2023 CL2	Madison	(Hong Kong) Lee Sze Wing (Hong Kong) Leung Bo Yee	(Hong Kong) Phoebe Tung (Hong Kong) Wing Yee Leung	(China) Sun Wanyue (China) Yan Xue	
China Track International Event I China 3 January 2023 CL2	Omnium	(Hong Kong) Tsun Wai Chu	(Hong Kong) Leung Chun Wing	(Hong Kong) Wan Yau Vincent Lau	
China Track International Event I China 3 January 2023 CL2	Omnium	(Hong Kong) Lee Sze Wing	(Hong Kong) Leung Bo Yee	(Hong Kong) Leung Wing Yee	
China Track International Event I China 3 January 2023 CL2	Sprint	(China) Chenxi Xue	(China) Qi Liu	(China) Weiming Yan	
China Track International Event I China 3 January 2023 CL2	Sprint	(China) Yuan Liying	(China) Guo Yufang	(China) Wei Zhuang	
China Track International Event II; China 4 January 2023 CL2	Keirin	(China) Chenxi Xue	(China) Qi Liu	(Hong Kong) Cheuk Hei To	
China Track International Event II; China 4 January 2023 CL2	Keirin	(China) Yuan Liying	(China) Jiang Yulu	(Hong Kong) Cho Yiu Yeung	
China Track International Event II; China 4 January 2023 CL2	Madison	(Hong Kong) Leung Chun Wing (Hong Kong) Tsun Wai Chu	(China) Junjie Wu (China) Haojun Hu	(Hong Kong) Mow Ching Yin (Hong Kong) Wan Yau Vincent Lau	
China Track International Event II; China 4 January 2023 CL2	Madison	(Hong Kong) Lee Sze Wing (Hong Kong) Leung Bo Yee	(Hong Kong) Phoebe Tung (Hong Kong) Wing Yee Leung	(China) Sun Wanyue (China) Yan Xue	
China Track International Event II; China 4 January 2023 CL2	Omnium	(Hong Kong) King Hung Liang	(Hong Kong) Wan Yau Vincent Lau	(China) Bai Zhengtao	
China Track International Event II; China 4 January 2023 CL2	Omnium	(Hong Kong) Lee Sze Wing	(Hong Kong) Leung Bo Yee	(China) Yan Xue	
China Track International Event II; China 4 January 2023 CL2	Sprint	(China) Yan Weiming	(Hong Kong) Tsun Ho Yung	(China) Xue Chenxi	
China Track International Event II; China 4 January 2023 CL2	Sprint	(China) Wei Zhuang	(China) Yuan Liying	(China) Jiang Yulu	
China Track International Event III; China 5 January 2023 CL2	Keirin	(China) Chenxi Xue	(China) Qi Liu	(Hong Kong) Tsun Ho Yung	
China Track International Event III; China 5 January 2023 CL2	Keirin	(China) Jiang Yulu	(China) Tong Mengqi	(Hong Kong) Yin Shan Ching	
China Track International Event III; China 5 January 2023 CL2	Madison	(Hong Kong) Leung Chun Wing (Hong Kong) Tsun Wai Chu	(China) Junjie Wu (China) Haojun Hu	(Hong Kong) Mow Ching Yin (Hong Kong) Wan Yau Vincent Lau	
China Track International Event III; China 5 January 2023 CL2	Madison	(China) Sun Wanyue (China) Yan Xue	(Hong Kong) Yang Qianyu (Hong Kong) Sze Wing Ng	(Hong Kong) Lee Sze Wing (Hong Kong) Leung Bo Yee	
China Track International Event III; China 5 January 2023 CL2	Omnium	(Hong Kong) Pak Hang Ng	(Hong Kong) Sum Lui Ng	(Hong Kong) Mow Ching Yin	
China Track International Event III; China 5 January 2023 CL2	Omnium	(Hong Kong) Lee Sze Wing	(Hong Kong) Leung Bo Yee	(Hong Kong) Phoebe Tung	
China Track International Event III; China 5 January 2023 CL2	Sprint	(China) Li Zhiwei	(Hong Kong) Zhan Zewei	(China) Guo Shuai	
China Track International Event III; China 5 January 2023 CL2	Sprint	(China) Jiang Yulu	(China) Wei Zhuang	(China) Zhang Linyin	
I Gipuzkoa Sari Nagusia; Spain 6–7 January 2023 CL2	Madison	(Spain) Albert Torres (Spain) Sebastián Mora	(Italy) Samuel Quaranta (Italy) Niccolò Galli	(Spain) Marc Terrasa (Spain) Francesc Bennassar	
I Gipuzkoa Sari Nagusia; Spain 6–7 January 2023 CL2	Madison	(Spain) Saioa Orgambide (Spain) Ana Estella	(Spain) Goretti Sesma (Spain) Amaia Esparza	(Spain) Naya Mangas (Spain) Isabella Escalera	
I Gipuzkoa Sari Nagusia; Spain 6–7 January 2023 CL2	Omnium	(Spain) Sebastián Mora	(Spain) Albert Torres	(Romania) Daniel Crista	
I Gipuzkoa Sari Nagusia; Spain 6–7 January 2023 CL2	Omnium	(Egypt) Ebtissam Mohamed	(Spain) Laura Rodríguez	(Spain) Isabel Ferreres	
I Gipuzkoa Sari Nagusia; Spain 6–7 January 2023 CL2	Scratch	(Spain) Sebastián Mora	(Spain) Albert Torres	(Austria) Felix Ritzinger	
I Gipuzkoa Sari Nagusia; Spain 6–7 January 2023 CL2	Scratch	(Egypt) Ebtissam Mohamed	(Spain) Laura Rodríguez	(Spain) Isabella Escalera	
I Gipuzkoa Sari Nagusia; Spain 6–7 January 2023 CL2	Sprint	(Italy) Mattia Predomo	(Spain) Ekain Jiménez	(Ukraine) Vladyslav Denysenko	
I Gipuzkoa Sari Nagusia; Spain 6–7 January 2023 CL2	Sprint	(Ukraine) Alla Biletska	(Spain) Helena Casas	(United States) Stephanie Lawrence	
GP Cambridge; New Zealand 6–7 January 2023 CL1	Men's Points Race	(New Zealand) Campbell Stewart	(New Zealand) Corbin Strong	(United Kingdom) Mark Stewart	
GP Cambridge; New Zealand 6–7 January 2023 CL1	Men's Elimination Race	(New Zealand) Campbell Stewart	(New Zealand) George Jackson	(New Zealand) Corbin Strong	
GP Cambridge; New Zealand 6–7 January 2023 CL1	Sprint	(Japan) Kaiya Ota	(New Zealand) Sam Dakin	(Republic of Ireland) Conor Rowley	
GP Cambridge; New Zealand 6–7 January 2023 CL1	Sprint	(New Zealand) Ellesse Andrews	(Japan) Riyu Ohta	(New Zealand) Olivia King	
GP Cambridge; New Zealand 6–7 January 2023 CL1	Keirin	(Japan) Kaiya Ota	(New Zealand) Sam Dakin	(New Zealand) Callum Saunders	
GP Cambridge; New Zealand 6–7 January 2023 CL1	Keirin	(Japan) Riyu Ohta	(New Zealand) Ellesse Andrews	(Australia) Selina Ho	
GP Cambridge; New Zealand 6–7 January 2023 CL1	Men's Scratch	(New Zealand) George Jackson	(New Zealand) Campbell Stewart	(United Kingdom) Mark Stewart	
GP Cambridge; New Zealand 6–7 January 2023 CL1	Men's Madison	(New Zealand) Campbell Stewart (New Zealand) Tom Sexton	(United Kingdom) Mark Stewart (New Zealand) Corbin Strong	(New Zealand) George Jackson (New Zealand) Keegan Hornblow	
GP Cambridge; New Zealand 6–7 January 2023 CL1	Men's Omnium	(New Zealand) Tom Sexton	(United Kingdom) Mark Stewart	(New Zealand) Daniel Bridgwater	
II Gipuzkoa Pista Saria; Spain 8 January 2023 CL2	Elimination Race	(Italy) Niccolò Galli	(Italy) Samuel Quaranta	(Austria) Tim Wafler	
II Gipuzkoa Pista Saria; Spain 8 January 2023 CL2	Elimination Race	(Egypt) Ebtissam Mohamed	(Spain) Isabel Ferreres	(Spain) Saioa Orgambide	
II Gipuzkoa Pista Saria; Spain 8 January 2023 CL2	Keirin	(Italy) Mattia Predomo	(Italy) Stefano Moro	(Ukraine) Vladyslav Denysenko	
II Gipuzkoa Pista Saria; Spain 8 January 2023 CL2	Keirin	(Ukraine) Alla Biletska	(Spain) Helena Casas	(United States) Stephanie Lawrence	
II Gipuzkoa Pista Saria; Spain 8 January 2023 CL2	Madison	(Spain) Albert Torres (Spain) Sebastián Mora	(Italy) Samuel Quaranta (Italy) Niccolò Galli	(Spain) Marc Terrasa (New Zealand) Francesc Bennassar	
II Gipuzkoa Pista Saria; Spain 8 January 2023 CL2	Madison	(Spain) Isabel Ferreres (Spain) Isabella Escalera	(Laos) Fanny Cauchois (Egypt) Ebtissam Mohamed	(Spain) Laura Rodríguez (Spain) Naya Mangas	
II Gipuzkoa Pista Saria; Spain 8 January 2023 CL2	Points Race	(Spain) Albert Torres	(Spain) Sebastián Mora	(Spain) Xabier Azparren	
II Gipuzkoa Pista Saria; Spain 8 January 2023 CL2	Points Race	(Spain) Laura Rodríguez	(Spain) Isabel Ferreres	(Egypt) Ebtissam Mohamed	
Grassroots Velodrome GP; New Zealand 8 January 2023 CL2	Keirin	(Japan) Kaiya Ota	(New Zealand) Callum Saunders	(Australia) Byron Davies	
Grassroots Velodrome GP; New Zealand 8 January 2023 CL2	Keirin	(New Zealand) Ellesse Andrews	(Japan) Riyu Ohta	(New Zealand) Shaane Fulton	
Grassroots Velodrome GP; New Zealand 8 January 2023 CL2	Sprint	(Japan) Kaiya Ota	(New Zealand) Sam Dakin	(Australia) Ryan Elliott	
Grassroots Velodrome GP; New Zealand 8 January 2023 CL2	Sprint	(New Zealand) Ellesse Andrews	(Japan) Riyu Ohta	(New Zealand) Rebecca Petch	
Grassroots Velodrome GP; New Zealand 8 January 2023 CL2	Men's Madison	(New Zealand) Campbell Stewart (New Zealand) Tom Sexton	(United Kingdom) Mark Stewart (New Zealand) George Jackson	(New Zealand) Corbin Strong (New Zealand) Keegan Hornblow	
Grassroots Velodrome GP; New Zealand 8 January 2023 CL2	Men's Omnium	(New Zealand) Tom Sexton	(New Zealand) Corbin Strong	(United Kingdom) Mark Stewart	
Adelaide Track League; Australia 12–13 January 2023 CL2	Elimination Race	(Netherlands) Jan-Willem van Schip	(Netherlands) Ryan Schilt	(South Korea) Park Sang-hoon	
Adelaide Track League; Australia 12–13 January 2023 CL2	Elimination Race	(Australia) Chloe Moran	(Australia) Alyssa Polites	(Australia) Keira Will	
Adelaide Track League; Australia 12–13 January 2023 CL2	Keirin	(Australia) Matthew Richardson	(Australia) Thomas Cornish	(Australia) Ryan Elliott	
Adelaide Track League; Australia 12–13 January 2023 CL2	Keirin	(Australia) Alessia McCaig	(Australia) Kristina Clonan	(Australia) Breanna Hargrave	
Adelaide Track League; Australia 12–13 January 2023 CL2	Omnium	(Australia) Kelland O'Brien	(Netherlands) Jan-Willem van Schip	(Austria) Maximilian Schmidbauer	
Adelaide Track League; Australia 12–13 January 2023 CL2	Omnium	(New Zealand) Ally Wollaston	(Australia) Alexandra Manly	(Australia) Chloe Moran	
Adelaide Track League; Australia 12–13 January 2023 CL2	Points Race	(Australia) Oliver Bleddyn	(Australia) Cameron Rogers	(Netherlands) Jan-Willem van Schip	
Adelaide Track League; Australia 12–13 January 2023 CL2	Points Race	(Australia) Alyssa Polites	(Australia) Sophie Marr	(Australia) Nicola Macdonald	
Adelaide Track League; Australia 12–13 January 2023 CL2	Scratch	(Netherlands) Ryan Schilt	(South Korea) Hun Jang	(Netherlands) Jan-Willem van Schip	
Adelaide Track League; Australia 12–13 January 2023 CL2	Scratch	(Australia) Chloe Moran	(Australia) Nicola Macdonald	(Australia) Sophie Marr	
Adelaide Track League; Australia 12–13 January 2023 CL2	Sprint	(Australia) Thomas Cornish	(Australia) Nathan Hart	(Australia) Leigh Hoffman	
Adelaide Track League; Australia 12–13 January 2023 CL2	Sprint	(Australia) Kristina Clonan	(Australia) Alessia McCaig	(Australia) Breanna Hargrave	
Six Days of Bremen; Germany 13–16 January 2023 CL2	Cancelled for 2023.				
Panevėžys 2023; Lithuania 20–21 January 2023 CL2	Women's Elimination Race	(Ukraine) Kseniia Fedotova	(Lithuania) Olivija Baleišytė	(Lithuania) Eglė Dubauskaitė	
Panevėžys 2023; Lithuania 20–21 January 2023 CL2	Keirin	(Poland) Rafał Sarnecki	(Lithuania) Vasilijus Lendel	(Ukraine) Vladyslav Denysenko	
Panevėžys 2023; Lithuania 20–21 January 2023 CL2	Keirin	(Poland) Urszula Łoś	(Ukraine) Alla Biletska	(Poland) Marlena Karwacka	
Panevėžys 2023; Lithuania 20–21 January 2023 CL2	Time Trial	(Lithuania) Justas Beniušis	(Ukraine) Bohdan Danylchuk	(Lithuania) Laurynas Vinskas	
Panevėžys 2023; Lithuania 20–21 January 2023 CL2	Time Trial	(Lithuania) Miglė Lendel	(Ukraine) Alla Biletska	(Belgium) Zoë Wolfs	
Panevėžys 2023; Lithuania 20–21 January 2023 CL2	Omnium	(Poland) Bartosz Rudyk	(Lithuania) Aivaras Mikutis	(Poland) Kacper Majewski	
Panevėžys 2023; Lithuania 20–21 January 2023 CL2	Omnium	(Lithuania) Olivija Baleišytė	(Ukraine) Kseniia Fedotova	(Ukraine) Anna Kolyzhuk	
Panevėžys 2023; Lithuania 20–21 January 2023 CL2	Men's Points Race	(Poland) Filip Prokopyszyn	(Poland) Wojciech Pszczolarski	(Poland) Kacper Majewski	
Panevėžys 2023; Lithuania 20–21 January 2023 CL2	Scratch	(Poland) Bartosz Rudyk	(Lithuania) Aivaras Mikutis	(Poland) Kacper Majewski	
Panevėžys 2023; Lithuania 20–21 January 2023 CL2	Scratch	(Lithuania) Eglė Dubauskaitė	(Lithuania) Olivija Baleišytė	(Ukraine) Kseniia Fedotova	
Panevėžys 2023; Lithuania 20–21 January 2023 CL2	Sprint	(Poland) Mateusz Rudyk	(Lithuania) Vasilijus Lendel	(Poland) Rafał Sarnecki	
Panevėžys 2023; Lithuania 20–21 January 2023 CL2	Sprint	(Poland) Paulina Petri	(Poland) Marlena Karwacka	(Ukraine) Alla Biletska	
Panevėžys 2023; Lithuania 20–21 January 2023 CL2	Men's Team Pursuit	(Lithuania) Aivaras Mikutis (Lithuania) Žygimantas Matuzevičius (Lithuania) Jomantas Venckus (Lithuania) Rokas Adomaitis	(Poland) Patryk Goszczurny (Poland) Marceli Pera (Poland) Wiktor Gałdyn (Poland) Kacper Mientki	(Lithuania) Justas Beniušis (Lithuania) Olegas Ivanovas (Belgium) Remi De Mey (Lithuania) Aristidas Kelmelis	
Troféu Internacional de Pista Artur Lopes; Portugal 20–22 January 2023 CL1	Sprint	(United Kingdom) Joseph Truman	(United Kingdom) Hamish Turnbull	(Canada) Nick Wammes	
Troféu Internacional de Pista Artur Lopes; Portugal 20–22 January 2023 CL1	Sprint	(United Kingdom) Katy Marchant	(United Kingdom) Lauren Bell	(Republic of Ireland) Orla Walsh	
Troféu Internacional de Pista Artur Lopes; Portugal 20–22 January 2023 CL1	Individual Pursuit	(Norway) Iver Knotten	(Netherlands) Brian Megens	(France) Mathieu Dupé	
Troféu Internacional de Pista Artur Lopes; Portugal 20–22 January 2023 CL1	Individual Pursuit	(Poland) Olga Wankiewicz	(Poland) Karolina Karasiewicz	(Spain) Isabel Ferreres	
Troféu Internacional de Pista Artur Lopes; Portugal 20–22 January 2023 CL1	Points Race	(United Kingdom) Oscar Nilsson-Julien	(Portugal) Iúri Leitão	(Portugal) João Matias	
Troféu Internacional de Pista Artur Lopes; Portugal 20–22 January 2023 CL1	Points Race	(France) Victoire Berteau	(Norway) Anita Stenberg	(France) Marion Borras	
Troféu Internacional de Pista Artur Lopes; Portugal 20–22 January 2023 CL1	Omnium	(United Kingdom) William Perrett	(Portugal) Iúri Leitão	(France) Thomas Boudat	
Troféu Internacional de Pista Artur Lopes; Portugal 20–22 January 2023 CL1	Omnium	(France) Valentine Fortin	(Norway) Anita Stenberg	(France) Victoire Berteau	
Troféu Internacional de Pista Artur Lopes; Portugal 20–22 January 2023 CL1	Scratch	(Portugal) João Matias	(Portugal) Rodrigo Caixas	(Austria) Raphael Kokas	
Troféu Internacional de Pista Artur Lopes; Portugal 20–22 January 2023 CL1	Scratch	(France) Marion Borras	(France) Valentine Fortin	(Norway) Anita Stenberg	
Troféu Internacional de Pista Artur Lopes; Portugal 20–22 January 2023 CL1	Keirin	(United Kingdom) Joseph Truman	(United Kingdom) Jack Carlin	(United Kingdom) Hamish Turnbull	
Troféu Internacional de Pista Artur Lopes; Portugal 20–22 January 2023 CL1	Keirin	(Spain) Helena Casas	(United Kingdom) Katy Marchant	(Republic of Ireland) Orla Walsh	
Troféu Internacional de Pista Artur Lopes; Portugal 20–22 January 2023 CL1	Madison	(France) Thomas Boudat (France) Valentin Tabellion	(Portugal) Iúri Leitão (Portugal) João Matias	(United Kingdom) William Perrett (United Kingdom) William Tidball	
Troféu Internacional de Pista Artur Lopes; Portugal 20–22 January 2023 CL1	Madison	(France) Victoire Berteau (France) Valentine Fortin	(France) Jade Labastugue (France) Marion Borras	(Spain) Eukene Larrarte (Spain) Laura Rodríguez	
Six Days of Berlin; Germany 27–29 January 2023 CL1	Madison	(Germany) Theo Reinhardt (Germany) Roger Kluge	(Netherlands) Yoeri Havik (Netherlands) Vincent Hoppezak	(Germany) Moritz Malcharek (Germany) Tim Torn Teutenberg	
Six Days of Berlin; Germany 27–29 January 2023 CL1	Madison	(Netherlands) Marit Raaijmakers (Netherlands) Mylène de Zoete	(Czech Republic) Petra Ševčíková (Czech Republic) Kateřina Kohoutková	(Germany) Franziska Brauße (Germany) Lea Lin Teutenberg	
Six Days of Berlin; Germany 27–29 January 2023 CL1	Sprint	(Germany) Stefan Bötticher	(Germany) Maximilian Dörnbach	(Germany) Robert Förstemann	
Six Days of Berlin; Germany 27–29 January 2023 CL1	Sprint	(Germany) Lea Friedrich	(Germany) Emma Hinze	(Germany) Pauline Grabosch	
Six Days of Berlin; Germany 27–29 January 2023 CL1	Women's Points Race	(Canada) Ariane Bonhomme	(Germany) Lea Lin Teutenberg	(Poland) Karolina Karasiewicz	
Grand Prix Poland; Poland 27–29 January 2023 CL2	Scratch	(Norway) Karsten Larsen Feldmann	(Poland) Damian Sławek	(Poland) Radosław Frątczak	
Grand Prix Poland; Poland 27–29 January 2023 CL2	Scratch	(France) Jade Labastugue	(Poland) Wiktoria Pikulik	(Czech Republic) Kristýna Burlová	
Grand Prix Poland; Poland 27–29 January 2023 CL2	Individual Pursuit	(Norway) Iver Knotten	(Poland) Bartosz Rudyk	(Poland) Kacper Majewski	
Grand Prix Poland; Poland 27–29 January 2023 CL2	Individual Pursuit	(Poland) Olga Wankiewicz	(France) Jade Labastugue	(Poland) Marianna Hall	
Grand Prix Poland; Poland 27–29 January 2023 CL2	Team Sprint	(Poland) Maciej Bielecki (Poland) Mateusz Rudyk (Poland) Patryk Rajkowski	(Czech Republic) Robin Wagner (Czech Republic) Dominik Topinka (Czech Republic) Jakub Šťastný	(Czech Republic) Martin Čechman (Czech Republic) Matěj Bohuslávek (Czech Republic) Matěj Hytych	
Grand Prix Poland; Poland 27–29 January 2023 CL2	Team Sprint	(Poland) Marlena Karwacka (Poland) Urszula Łoś (Poland) Nikola Sibiak	(Czech Republic) Anna Jaborníková (Czech Republic) Sára Peterková (Czech Republic) Natálie Mikšaníková	(Ukraine) Alla Biletska (Ukraine) Karolina Keliukh (Ukraine) Yelyzaveta Holod	
Grand Prix Poland; Poland 27–29 January 2023 CL2	Elimination Race	(Poland) Damian Sławek	(Hungary) Viktor Filutás	(Ukraine) Maksym Vasilyev	
Grand Prix Poland; Poland 27–29 January 2023 CL2	Elimination Race	(France) Jade Labastugue	(Poland) Patrycja Lorkowska	(Lithuania) Olivija Baleišytė	
Grand Prix Poland; Poland 27–29 January 2023 CL2	Points Race	(Poland) Bartosz Rudyk	(Norway) Sander Granberg	(Poland) Dominik Ratajczak	
Grand Prix Poland; Poland 27–29 January 2023 CL2	Points Race	(France) Aurore Pernollet	(Poland) Wiktoria Pikulik	(France) Jade Labastugue	
Grand Prix Poland; Poland 27–29 January 2023 CL2	Omnium	(Poland) Bartosz Rudyk	(Norway) Karsten Feldmann	(Norway) Iver Knotten	
Grand Prix Poland; Poland 27–29 January 2023 CL2	Omnium	(France) Jade Labastugue	(Poland) Wiktoria Pikulik	(Czech Republic) Kristýna Burlová	
Grand Prix Poland; Poland 27–29 January 2023 CL2	Sprint	(Lithuania) Vasilijus Lendel	(Poland) Maciej Bielecki	(Czech Republic) Martin Čechman	
Grand Prix Poland; Poland 27–29 January 2023 CL2	Sprint	(Poland) Paulina Petri	(Poland) Urszula Łoś	(Poland) Marlena Karwacka	
Grand Prix Poland; Poland 27–29 January 2023 CL2	Madison	(Poland) Bartosz Rudyk (Poland) Kacper Majewski	(Poland) Piotr Maślak (Poland) Radosław Frątczak	(Ukraine) Valentyn Kabashnyi (Ukraine) Maksym Vasilyev	
Grand Prix Poland; Poland 27–29 January 2023 CL2	Madison	(Poland) Wiktoria Pikulik (Poland) Nikol Płosaj	(France) Jade Labastugue (France) Aurore Pernollet	(Ukraine) Anna Kolyzhuk (Ukraine) Kseniia Fedotova	
Grand Prix Poland; Poland 27–29 January 2023 CL2	Keirin	(Poland) Mateusz Rudyk	(Poland) Rafał Sarnecki	(Lithuania) Vasilijus Lendel	
Grand Prix Poland; Poland 27–29 January 2023 CL2	Keirin	(Poland) Nikola Sibiak	(Poland) Marlena Karwacka	(Czech Republic) Anna Jaborníková	
Troféu Internacional de Pista - SUNLIVE; Portugal 28 January 2023 CL2	Omnium	(Portugal) Iúri Leitão	(Portugal) Rodrigo Caixas	(Portugal) Diogo Narciso	
Troféu Internacional de Pista - SUNLIVE; Portugal 28 January 2023 CL2	Omnium	(Greece) Argiro Milaki	(Uzbekistan) Margarita Misyurina	(Spain) Isabel Ferreres	
Troféu Internacional de Pista - SUNLIVE; Portugal 28 January 2023 CL2	Men's Keirin	(Italy) Mattia Predomo	(Greece) Sotirios Bretas	(Italy) Stefano Moro	
Troféu Internacional de Pista - SUNLIVE; Portugal 28 January 2023 CL2	Men's Sprint	(Italy) Mattia Predomo	(Israel) Mikhail Iakovlev	(South Africa) Jean Spies	
Troféu Internacional de Pista - SUNLIVE; Portugal 28 January 2023 CL2	Madison	(Portugal) Diogo Narciso (Portugal) Iúri Leitão	(Portugal) Daniel Dias (Portugal) Rodrigo Caixas	(Italy) Samuel Quaranta (Italy) Niccolò Galli	
Troféu Internacional de Pista - SUNLIVE; Portugal 28 January 2023 CL2	Madison	(Spain) Isabel Ferreres (Spain) Ainara Albert Bosch	(Uzbekistan) Nafosat Kozieva (Uzbekistan) Margarita Misyurina	(Austria) Verena Eberhardt (Austria) Kathrin Schweinberger	
2023 UEC European Track Championships; Switzerland 8–12 February 2023 CC	Sprint	(Netherlands) Harrie Lavreysen	(Poland) Mateusz Rudyk	(France) Rayan Helal	
2023 UEC European Track Championships; Switzerland 8–12 February 2023 CC	Sprint	(Germany) Lea Friedrich	(Germany) Pauline Grabosch	(United Kingdom) Sophie Capewell	
2023 UEC European Track Championships; Switzerland 8–12 February 2023 CC	Team Sprint	Netherlands (NED); Jeffrey Hoogland; Harrie Lavreysen; Roy van den Berg; Tijmen van Loon	Great Britain (GBR); Jack Carlin; Alistair Fielding; Hamish Turnbull; Joseph Truman	France (FRA); Timmy Gillion; Melvin Landerneau; Sébastien Vigier	
2023 UEC European Track Championships; Switzerland 8–12 February 2023 CC	Team Sprint	Germany (GER); Lea Friedrich; Pauline Grabosch; Emma Hinze; Alessa-Catriona Pröpster	Great Britain (GBR); Lauren Bell; Emma Finucane; Katy Marchant; Sophie Capewell	Netherlands (NED); Kyra Lamberink; Hetty van de Wouw; Steffie van der Peet	
2023 UEC European Track Championships; Switzerland 8–12 February 2023 CC	Team Pursuit	Italy (ITA); Filippo Ganna; Francesco Lamon; Jonathan Milan; Manlio Moro; Simone Consonni	Great Britain (GBR); Daniel Bigham; Charlie Tanfield; Ethan Vernon; Oliver Wood	France (FRA); Thomas Denis; Corentin Ermenault; Quentin Lafargue; Benjamin Thomas; Adrien Garel	
2023 UEC European Track Championships; Switzerland 8–12 February 2023 CC	Team Pursuit	Great Britain (GBR); Katie Archibald; Neah Evans; Josie Knight; Anna Morris; Elinor Barker	Italy (ITA); Martina Alzini; Elisa Balsamo; Martina Fidanza; Vittoria Guazzini; Letizia Paternoster	Germany (GER); Franziska Brauße; Lisa Klein; Mieke Kröger; Laura Süßemilch	
2023 UEC European Track Championships; Switzerland 8–12 February 2023 CC	Keirin	(Netherlands) Harrie Lavreysen	(Poland) Patryk Rajkowski	(Netherlands) Jeffrey Hoogland	
2023 UEC European Track Championships; Switzerland 8–12 February 2023 CC	Keirin	(Germany) Lea Friedrich	(United Kingdom) Emma Finucane	(Germany) Emma Hinze	
2023 UEC European Track Championships; Switzerland 8–12 February 2023 CC	Omnium	(France) Benjamin Thomas	(Italy) Simone Consonni	(United Kingdom) William Perrett	
2023 UEC European Track Championships; Switzerland 8–12 February 2023 CC	Omnium	(United Kingdom) Katie Archibald	(Poland) Daria Pikulik	(Belgium) Lotte Kopecky	
2023 UEC European Track Championships; Switzerland 8–12 February 2023 CC	Madison	(Germany) Roger Kluge (Germany) Theo Reinhardt	(Italy) Simone Consonni (Italy) Michele Scartezzini	(France) Donavan Grondin (France) Benjamin Thomas	
2023 UEC European Track Championships; Switzerland 8–12 February 2023 CC	Madison	(United Kingdom) Katie Archibald (United Kingdom) Elinor Barker	(France) Victoire Berteau (France) Clara Copponi	(Italy) Elisa Balsamo (Italy) Vittoria Guazzini	
2023 UEC European Track Championships; Switzerland 8–12 February 2023 CC	Time Trial	(Netherlands) Jeffrey Hoogland	(Spain) Alejandro Martínez	(Germany) Maximilian Dörnbach	
2023 UEC European Track Championships; Switzerland 8–12 February 2023 CC	Time Trial	(Germany) Emma Hinze	(France) Taky Marie-Divine Kouamé	(Netherlands) Hetty van de Wouw	
2023 UEC European Track Championships; Switzerland 8–12 February 2023 CC	Individual pursuit	(Italy) Jonathan Milan	(United Kingdom) Daniel Bigham	(Germany) Tobias Buck-Gramcko	
2023 UEC European Track Championships; Switzerland 8–12 February 2023 CC	Individual pursuit	(Germany) Franziska Brauße	(United Kingdom) Josie Knight	(Germany) Mieke Kröger	
2023 UEC European Track Championships; Switzerland 8–12 February 2023 CC	Points Race	(Italy) Simone Consonni	(Spain) Albert Torres	(France) Donavan Grondin	
2023 UEC European Track Championships; Switzerland 8–12 February 2023 CC	Points Race	(Norway) Anita Stenberg	(Belgium) Shari Bossuyt	(France) Marie Le Net	
2023 UEC European Track Championships; Switzerland 8–12 February 2023 CC	Scratch	(United Kingdom) Oliver Wood	(Netherlands) Roy Eefting	(France) Donavan Grondin	
2023 UEC European Track Championships; Switzerland 8–12 February 2023 CC	Scratch	(Portugal) Maria Martins	(Spain) Eukene Larrarte	(Poland) Daria Pikulik	
2023 UEC European Track Championships; Switzerland 8–12 February 2023 CC	Elimination Race	(Germany) Tim Torn Teutenberg	(Portugal) Rui Oliveira	(Netherlands) Philip Heijnen	
2023 UEC European Track Championships; Switzerland 8–12 February 2023 CC	Elimination Race	(Belgium) Lotte Kopecky	(France) Valentine Fortin	(Netherlands) Maike van der Duin	
2023 UCI Track Cycling Nations Cup Round 1 Indonesia 23–26 February 2023 CDN	Sprint	(Netherlands) Harrie Lavreysen	(Japan) Kaiya Ota	(Israel) Mikhail Iakovlev	
2023 UCI Track Cycling Nations Cup Round 1 Indonesia 23–26 February 2023 CDN	Sprint	(Germany) Mathilde Gros	(Germany) Lea Friedrich	(United Kingdom) Emma Finucane	
2023 UCI Track Cycling Nations Cup Round 1 Indonesia 23–26 February 2023 CDN	Team Sprint	Australia (AUS); Leigh Hoffman; Matthew Richardson; Thomas Cornish	Netherlands (NED); Roy van den Berg; Harrie Lavreysen; Jeffrey Hoogland	France (FRA); Florian Grengbo; Sébastien Vigier; Rayan Helal	
2023 UCI Track Cycling Nations Cup Round 1 Indonesia 23–26 February 2023 CDN	Team Sprint	Germany (GER); Pauline Grabosch; Emma Hinze; Lea Friedrich	China (CHN); Guo Yufang; Bao Shanju; Yuan Liying	Great Britain (GBR); Lauren Bell; Sophie Capewell; Emma Finucane	
2023 UCI Track Cycling Nations Cup Round 1 Indonesia 23–26 February 2023 CDN	Team Pursuit	Denmark (DEN); Tobias Hansen; Robin Skivild; Carl-Frederik Bévort; Rasmus Pedersen	New Zealand (NZL); Aaron Gate; Campbell Stewart; Daniel Bridgwater; Nick Kergozou	Great Britain (GBR); Oliver Wood; William Tidball; Rhys Britton; Charles Tanfield	
2023 UCI Track Cycling Nations Cup Round 1 Indonesia 23–26 February 2023 CDN	Team Pursuit	New Zealand (NZL); Michaela Drummond; Ally Wollaston; Bryony Botha; Emily Shearman	France (FRA); Victoire Berteau; Clara Copponi; Valentine Fortin; Marion Borras	Great Britain (GBR); Sophie Lewis; Josie Knight; Anna Morris; Jessica Roberts	
2023 UCI Track Cycling Nations Cup Round 1 Indonesia 23–26 February 2023 CDN	Keirin	(Netherlands) Harrie Lavreysen	(Malaysia) Azizulhasni Awang	(Israel) Mikhail Iakovlev	
2023 UCI Track Cycling Nations Cup Round 1 Indonesia 23–26 February 2023 CDN	Keirin	(Japan) Mina Sato	(France) Mathilde Gros	(Japan) Fuko Umekawa	
2023 UCI Track Cycling Nations Cup Round 1 Indonesia 23–26 February 2023 CDN	Omnium	(Denmark) Tobias Hansen	(New Zealand) Campbell Stewart	(Spain) Sebastián Mora	
2023 UCI Track Cycling Nations Cup Round 1 Indonesia 23–26 February 2023 CDN	Omnium	(New Zealand) Ally Wollaston	(France) Clara Copponi	(United Kingdom) Neah Evans	
2023 UCI Track Cycling Nations Cup Round 1 Indonesia 23–26 February 2023 CDN	Madison	(Germany) Roger Kluge (Germany) Theo Reinhardt	(Netherlands) Jan-Willem van Schip (Netherlands) Yoeri Havik	(New Zealand) Aaron Gate (New Zealand) Campbell Stewart	
2023 UCI Track Cycling Nations Cup Round 1 Indonesia 23–26 February 2023 CDN	Madison	(Denmark) Amalie Dideriksen (Denmark) Julie Leth	(France) Valentine Fortin (France) Marion Borras	(Italy) Martina Fidanza (Italy) Silvia Zanardi	
2023 UCI Track Cycling Nations Cup Round 1 Indonesia 23–26 February 2023 CDN	Elimination Race	(Japan) Eiya Hashimoto	(Belgium) Jules Hesters	(Netherlands) Yoeri Havik	
2023 UCI Track Cycling Nations Cup Round 1 Indonesia 23–26 February 2023 CDN	Elimination Race	(New Zealand) Ally Wollaston	(United Kingdom) Neah Evans	(Netherlands) Marit Raaijmakers	
2023 CAC African Track Championships; Egypt 5–9 March 2023 CC	Elimination Race	(Algeria) Yacine Chalel	(South Africa) Wynand Hofmeyr	(Algeria) Mohamed Nadjib Assal	
2023 CAC African Track Championships; Egypt 5–9 March 2023 CC	Elimination Race	(Egypt) Ebtissam Mohamed	(South Africa) Danielle van Niekerk	(South Africa) Ainsli de Beer	
2023 CAC African Track Championships; Egypt 5–9 March 2023 CC	Team Sprint	South Africa (RSA); Jean Spies; Johannes Myburgh; Mitchell Sparrow	Egypt (EGY); Hussein Hassan; Khaled Allam; Abdelrahman Salem		
2023 CAC African Track Championships; Egypt 5–9 March 2023 CC	Team Sprint	Nigeria (NGR); Tawakalt Yekeen; Grace Ayuba; Treasure Melubari Coxson			
2023 CAC African Track Championships; Egypt 5–9 March 2023 CC	Team Pursuit	South Africa (RSA); Joshua van Wyk; Daniyal Mathews; Carl Bonthuys; Wynand Hofmeyr	Egypt (EGY); Youssef Abouelhassan; Mahmoud Bakr; Ahmed Saad; Assem Elhusseini Khalil	Algeria (ALG); Lotfi Tchambaz; Yacine Chalel; Mohamed Nadjib Assal; Hamza Megnouche	
2023 CAC African Track Championships; Egypt 5–9 March 2023 CC	Team Pursuit	South Africa (RSA); Kerry Jonker; Charlissa Schultz; Danielle van Niekerk; S'Annara Grove	Nigeria (NGR); Gripa Tombrapa; Ese Ukpeseraye; Adejoke Durogbade; Tawakalt Yekeen		
2023 CAC African Track Championships; Egypt 5–9 March 2023 CC	Keirin	(South Africa) Jordan September	(South Africa) Joshua Wentzel	(Egypt) Sayed Elkadia	
2023 CAC African Track Championships; Egypt 5–9 March 2023 CC	Keirin	(South Africa) S'Annara Grove	(Egypt) Shahd Mohamed	(Nigeria) Ese Ukpeseraye	
2023 CAC African Track Championships; Egypt 5–9 March 2023 CC	Omnium	(South Africa) Joshua van Wyk	(South Africa) Carl Bonthuys	(South Africa) Wynand Hofmeyr	
2023 CAC African Track Championships; Egypt 5–9 March 2023 CC	Omnium	(Egypt) Ebtissam Mohamed	(South Africa) S'Annara Grove	(South Africa) Kerry Jonker	
2023 CAC African Track Championships; Egypt 5–9 March 2023 CC	Madison	(South Africa) Carl Bonthuys (South Africa) Wynand Hofmeyr	(Algeria) Lotfi Tchambaz (Algeria) Yacine Chalel	(Egypt) Youssef Abouelhassan (Egypt) Ahmed Saad	
2023 CAC African Track Championships; Egypt 5–9 March 2023 CC	Madison	(South Africa) Tia Marnewick (South Africa) Jesse Woods	(South Africa) Fjorn Lakay (South Africa) Anya du Plessis	(Egypt) Alaliaa Darwish (Egypt) Habiba Osama	
2023 CAC African Track Championships; Egypt 5–9 March 2023 CC	Time Trial	(South Africa) Johannes Myburgh	(South Africa) Mitchell Sparrow	(Egypt) Hussein Hassan	
2023 CAC African Track Championships; Egypt 5–9 March 2023 CC	Time Trial	(Nigeria) Ese Ukpeseraye	(Egypt) Shahd Mohamed	(South Africa) S'Annara Grove	
2023 CAC African Track Championships; Egypt 5–9 March 2023 CC	Individual pursuit	(Algeria) Lotfi Tchambaz	(Egypt) Mahmoud Bakr	(South Africa) Wynand Hofmeyr	
2023 CAC African Track Championships; Egypt 5–9 March 2023 CC	Individual pursuit	(South Africa) Kerry Jonker	(South Africa) Charlissa Schultz	(South Africa) Danielle Van Niekerk	
2023 CAC African Track Championships; Egypt 5–9 March 2023 CC	Points Race	(South Africa) Joshua van Wyk	(Algeria) Mohamed Nadjib Assal	(South Africa) Carl Bonthuys	
2023 CAC African Track Championships; Egypt 5–9 March 2023 CC	Points Race	(Egypt) Ebtissam Zayed Ahmed	(South Africa) S'Annara Grove	(South Africa) Kerry Jonker	
2023 CAC African Track Championships; Egypt 5–9 March 2023 CC	Scratch	(South Africa) Matthew Lester	(Algeria) Lotfi Tchambaz	(South Africa) Joshua van Wyk	
2023 CAC African Track Championships; Egypt 5–9 March 2023 CC	Scratch	(Egypt) Ebtissam Zayed Ahmed	(South Africa) Kerry Jonker	(Nigeria) Ese Ukpeseraye	
2023 CAC African Track Championships; Egypt 5–9 March 2023 CC	Sprint	(South Africa) Jean Spies	(South Africa) Johannes Myburgh	(Egypt) Hussein Hassan	
2023 CAC African Track Championships; Egypt 5–9 March 2023 CC	Sprint	(Egypt) Shahd Mohamed	(Nigeria) Gripa Tombrapa	(Ivory Coast) Sarah Kouamé Affoué	
2023 UCI Track Cycling Nations Cup Round 2 Egypt 14–17 March 2023 CDN	Sprint	(Netherlands) Harrie Lavreysen	(Israel) Mikhail Iakovlev	(Japan) Kaiya Ota	
2023 UCI Track Cycling Nations Cup Round 2 Egypt 14–17 March 2023 CDN	Sprint	(United Kingdom) Emma Finucane	(United Kingdom) Sophie Capewell	(Germany) Emma Hinze	
2023 UCI Track Cycling Nations Cup Round 2 Egypt 14–17 March 2023 CDN	Team Sprint	Netherlands (NED); Jeffrey Hoogland; Harrie Lavreysen; Roy van den Berg	France (FRA); Timmy Gillion; Rayan Helal; Sébastien Vigier	Japan (JPN); Yoshitaku Nagasako; Yuta Obara; Kaiya Ota	
2023 UCI Track Cycling Nations Cup Round 2 Egypt 14–17 March 2023 CDN	Team Sprint	China (CHN); Bao Shanju; Guo Yufang; Yuan Liying	Germany (GER); Lea Friedrich; Pauline Grabosch; Emma Hinze	France (FRA); Mathilde Gros; Taky Marie-Divine Kouamé; Julie Michaux	
2023 UCI Track Cycling Nations Cup Round 2 Egypt 14–17 March 2023 CDN	Team Pursuit	Denmark (DEN); Tobias Hansen; Rasmus Pedersen; Carl-Frederik Bévort; Robin Skivild	France (FRA); Thomas Denis; Corentin Ermenault; Quentin Lafargue; Valentin Tabellion	Germany (GER); Benjamin Boos; Theo Reinhardt; Tobias Buck-Gramcko; Leon Rohde	
2023 UCI Track Cycling Nations Cup Round 2 Egypt 14–17 March 2023 CDN	Team Pursuit	France (FRA); Clara Copponi; Valentine Fortin; Marion Borras; Marie Le Net	New Zealand (NZL); Bryony Botha; Ally Wollaston; Samantha Donnelly; Emily Shearman	Germany (GER); Franziska Brauße; Lisa Klein; Mieke Kröger; Laura Süßemilch	
2023 UCI Track Cycling Nations Cup Round 2 Egypt 14–17 March 2023 CDN	Keirin	(Netherlands) Shinji Nakano	(Malaysia) Muhammad Shah Firdaus Sahrom	(Japan) Kaiya Ota	
2023 UCI Track Cycling Nations Cup Round 2 Egypt 14–17 March 2023 CDN	Keirin	(Japan) Mina Sato	(Belgium) Nicky Degrendele	(Germany) Alessa-Catriona Pröpster	
2023 UCI Track Cycling Nations Cup Round 2 Egypt 14–17 March 2023 CDN	Omnium	(France) Thomas Boudat	(Italy) Elia Viviani	(Germany) Roger Kluge	
2023 UCI Track Cycling Nations Cup Round 2 Egypt 14–17 March 2023 CDN	Omnium	(New Zealand) Ally Wollaston	(France) Victoire Berteau	(Denmark) Amalie Dideriksen	
2023 UCI Track Cycling Nations Cup Round 2 Egypt 14–17 March 2023 CDN	Madison	(Germany) Roger Kluge (Germany) Theo Reinhardt	(Netherlands) Jan-Willem van Schip (Netherlands) Yoeri Havik	(New Zealand) George Jackson (New Zealand) Tom Sexton	
2023 UCI Track Cycling Nations Cup Round 2 Egypt 14–17 March 2023 CDN	Madison	(France) Clara Copponi (France) Valentine Fortin	(Denmark) Amalie Dideriksen (Denmark) Julie Leth	(New Zealand) Bryony Botha (New Zealand) Ally Wollaston	
2023 UCI Track Cycling Nations Cup Round 2 Egypt 14–17 March 2023 CDN	Elimination Race	(United Kingdom) William Tidball	(Netherlands) Yoeri Havik	(Italy) Michele Scartezzini	
2023 UCI Track Cycling Nations Cup Round 2 Egypt 14–17 March 2023 CDN	Elimination Race	(United States) Jennifer Valente	(France) Victoire Berteau	(United Kingdom) Sophie Lewis	
Silk Road Namangan I Uzbekistan 24–26 March 2023 CL2
Silk Road Namangan I Uzbekistan 24–26 March 2023 CL2	Team Pursuit	Uzbekistan (UZB); Aleksey Fomovskiy; Dmitriy Bocharov; Danil Evdokimov; Edem Eminov	Kirill Malkov; Aleksandr Ivanov; Aleksandr Tishkin; Yurii Butrekhin	Hong Kong (HKG); Tsun Wai Chu; Kai Kwong Tso; King Hung Liang; Pak Hang Ng	
Silk Road Namangan I Uzbekistan 24–26 March 2023 CL2	Team Pursuit	Uzbekistan (UZB); Sofiya Karimova; Madina Kakhkhorova; Margarita Misyurina; Nafosat Kozieva	Uzbekistan (UZB); Asal Rizaeva; Ekaterina Knebeleva; Shakhnoza Abdullaeva; Sevinch Yuldasheva	Uzbekistan (UZB); Kristina Ivanova; Evgeniya Golotina; Kseniya Li; Mohinabonu Elmurodova	
Silk Road Namangan I Uzbekistan 24–26 March 2023 CL2	Team Sprint	Hong Kong (HKG); Cheuk Hei To; Chun Mok Tsz; Tsun Ho Yung	Aleksei Kozubenko; Maksim Bunkov; Sergei Demianov	Uzbekistan (UZB); Ruslan Djalalitdinov; Yevgeniy Dmitriyenko; Asadbek Eshankulov	
Silk Road Namangan I Uzbekistan 24–26 March 2023 CL2	Team Sprint	Hong Kong (HKG); Yeung Cho-yiu; Sze Wing Ng; Phoebe Tung	Uzbekistan (UZB); Rinata Sultanova; Madina Kakhkhorova; Sevinch Yuldasheva	Uzbekistan (UZB); Anastasya Safonova; Sabina Zaxidova; Diana Irmatova	
Silk Road Namangan I Uzbekistan 24–26 March 2023 CL2	Points Race	(Kazakhstan) Ruslan Yelyubayev	Yurii Butrekhin	Kirill Malkov	
Silk Road Namangan I Uzbekistan 24–26 March 2023 CL2	Points Race	(Uzbekistan) Olga Zabelinskaya	(Uzbekistan) Yanina Kuskova	(Kazakhstan) Rinata Sultanova	
Silk Road Namangan I Uzbekistan 24–26 March 2023 CL2	Omnium	(Kazakhstan) Ramis Dinmukhametov	(Hong Kong) Tsun Wai Chu	(Uzbekistan) Dmitriy Bocharov	
Silk Road Namangan I Uzbekistan 24–26 March 2023 CL2	Omnium	(Uzbekistan) Olga Zabelinskaya	(Uzbekistan) Margarita Misyurina	(Kazakhstan) Rinata Sultanova	
Silk Road Namangan I Uzbekistan 24–26 March 2023 CL2	Sprint	(Hong Kong) Tsun Ho Yung	(Hong Kong) Cheuk Hei To	Andrey Shevtsov	
Silk Road Namangan I Uzbekistan 24–26 March 2023 CL2	Sprint	(Hong Kong) Yeung Cho-yiu	(Hong Kong) Phoebe Tung	(Hong Kong) Sze Wing Ng	
Silk Road Namangan I Uzbekistan 24–26 March 2023 CL2	Scratch	(Kazakhstan) Ilya Karabutov	(Kazakhstan) Ruslan Yelyubayev	Aleksandr Ivanov	
Silk Road Namangan I Uzbekistan 24–26 March 2023 CL2	Scratch	(Uzbekistan) Margarita Misyurina	(Kazakhstan) Rinata Sultanova	(Uzbekistan) Sofiya Karimova	
Silk Road Namangan I Uzbekistan 24–26 March 2023 CL2	Elimination Race	Kirill Malkov	(Kazakhstan) Dmitriy Noskov	Aleksandr Ivanov	
Silk Road Namangan I Uzbekistan 24–26 March 2023 CL2	Elimination Race	(Uzbekistan) Nafosat Kozieva	(Uzbekistan) Margarita Misyurina	(Uzbekistan) Madina Kakhkhorova	
Silk Road Namangan I Uzbekistan 24–26 March 2023 CL2	Madison	(Kazakhstan) Ramis Dinmukhametov (Kazakhstan) Ruslan Yelyubayev	(Uzbekistan) Dmitriy Bocharov (Uzbekistan) Nikita Tsvetkov	Kirill Malkov; Aleksandr Ivanov	
Silk Road Namangan I Uzbekistan 24–26 March 2023 CL2	Madison	(Uzbekistan) Olga Zabelinskaya (Uzbekistan) Nafosat Kozieva	(Uzbekistan) Margarita Misyurina (Uzbekistan) Ekaterina Knebeleva	(Hong Kong) Sze Wing Ng (Hong Kong) Phoebe Tung	
Silk Road Namangan I Uzbekistan 24–26 March 2023 CL2	Keirin	(Kazakhstan) Kirill Kurdidi	(Hong Kong) Mok Tsz Chun	Andriy Shevchenko	
Silk Road Namangan I Uzbekistan 24–26 March 2023 CL2	Keirin	(Hong Kong) Yeung Cho-yiu	(Hong Kong) Sze Wing Ng	(Hong Kong) Phoebe Tung	
Silk Road Namangan I Uzbekistan 24–26 March 2023 CL2	Individual Pursuit	(Kazakhstan) Ilya Karabutov	(Kazakhstan) Ruslan Yelyubayev	Aleksandr Ivanov	
Silk Road Namangan I Uzbekistan 24–26 March 2023 CL2	Individual Pursuit	(Uzbekistan) Margarita Misyurina	(Kazakhstan) Rinata Sultanova	(Uzbekistan) Sofiya Karimova	
2023 Oceania Track Championships; Australia 24–28 March 2023 CC
2023 Oceania Track Championships; Australia 24–28 March 2023 CC	Team Sprint	Australia (AUS); Leigh Hoffman; Nathan Hart; Matthew Richardson	New Zealand (NZL); Jaxson Russell; Luke Blackwood; Dylan Day	Australia (AUS); Ryan Elliott; Thomas Cornish; James Brister	
2023 Oceania Track Championships; Australia 24–28 March 2023 CC	Team Sprint	Australia (AUS); Kristina Clonan; Alessia McCaig; Molly McGill	New Zealand (NZL); Rebecca Petch; Ellesse Andrews; Olivia King	Australia (AUS); Sophie Watts; Breanna Hargrave; Kalinda Robinson	
2023 Oceania Track Championships; Australia 24–28 March 2023 CC	Team Pursuit	Australia (AUS); Blake Agnoletto; Oliver Bleddyn; Josh Duffy; Conor Leahy	New Zealand (NZL); Nick Kergozou; Daniel Bridgwater; Keegan Hornblow; George Jackson	Australia (AUS); Liam Walsh; John Carter; Graeme Frislie; James Moriarty	
2023 Oceania Track Championships; Australia 24–28 March 2023 CC	Team Pursuit	Australia (AUS); Claudia Marcks; Alli Anderson; Sophie Edwards; Chloe Moran	New Zealand (NZL); Sami Donnelly; Prudence Fowler; Jessie Hodges; Rylee McMullen		
2023 Oceania Track Championships; Australia 24–28 March 2023 CC	Scratch	(Australia) Josh Duffy	(New Zealand) George Jackson	(Australia) Angus Miller	
2023 Oceania Track Championships; Australia 24–28 March 2023 CC	Scratch	(Australia) Chloe Moran	(Australia) Lucinda Stewart	(Australia) Alexandra Martin-Wallace	
2023 Oceania Track Championships; Australia 24–28 March 2023 CC	Individual Pursuit	(Australia) James Moriarty	(New Zealand) Tom Sexton	(New Zealand) Keegan Hornblow	
2023 Oceania Track Championships; Australia 24–28 March 2023 CC	Individual Pursuit	(New Zealand) Bryony Botha	(New Zealand) Emily Shearman	(Australia) Claudia Marcks	
2023 Oceania Track Championships; Australia 24–28 March 2023 CC	Sprint	(Australia) Matthew Richardson	(Australia) Leigh Hoffman	(Australia) Matthew Glaetzer	
2023 Oceania Track Championships; Australia 24–28 March 2023 CC	Sprint	(New Zealand) Ellesse Andrews	(Australia) Kristina Clonan	(Australia) Breanna Hargrave	
2023 Oceania Track Championships; Australia 24–28 March 2023 CC	Keirin	(Australia) Matthew Richardson	(Australia) James Brister	(Australia) Matthew Glaetzer	
2023 Oceania Track Championships; Australia 24–28 March 2023 CC	Keirin	(Australia) Kristina Clonan	(New Zealand) Ellesse Andrews	(Australia) Selina Ho	
2023 Oceania Track Championships; Australia 24–28 March 2023 CC	Elimination Race	(New Zealand) Daniel Bridgwater	(New Zealand) Tom Sexton	(Australia) Josh Duffy	
2023 Oceania Track Championships; Australia 24–28 March 2023 CC	Elimination Race	(New Zealand) Rylee McMullen	(New Zealand) Bryony Botha	(New Zealand) Sami Donnelly	
2023 Oceania Track Championships; Australia 24–28 March 2023 CC	Omnium	(Australia) John Carter	(New Zealand) Tom Sexton	(Australia) Conor Leahy	
2023 Oceania Track Championships; Australia 24–28 March 2023 CC	Omnium	(Australia) Chloe Moran	(New Zealand) Emily Shearman	(Australia) Sophie Edwards	
2023 Oceania Track Championships; Australia 24–28 March 2023 CC	Points Race	(New Zealand) George Jackson	(New Zealand) Tom Sexton	(Australia) Josh Duffy	
2023 Oceania Track Championships; Australia 24–28 March 2023 CC	Points Race	(Australia) Chloe Moran	(New Zealand) Bryony Botha	(New Zealand) Rylee McMullen	
2023 Oceania Track Championships; Australia 24–28 March 2023 CC	Madison	(Australia) Blake Agnoletto (Australia) Oliver Bleddyn	(New Zealand) Tom Sexton (New Zealand) George Jackson	(New Zealand) Keegan Hornblow (New Zealand) Daniel Bridgwater	
2023 Oceania Track Championships; Australia 24–28 March 2023 CC	Madison	(New Zealand) Bryony Botha (New Zealand) Jessie Hodges	(Australia) Sophie Marr (Australia) Chloe Moran	(New Zealand) Keegan Hornblow (New Zealand) Daniel Bridgwater	
2023 Oceania Track Championships; Australia 24–28 March 2023 CC	Time Trial	(Australia) Matthew Glaetzer	(Australia) Thomas Cornish	(Australia) Byron Davies	
2023 Oceania Track Championships; Australia 24–28 March 2023 CC	Time Trial	(Australia) Kristina Clonan	(New Zealand) Rebecca Petch	(New Zealand) Olivia King	
Tel Aviv Open Championships; Israel 25 March 2023 CL2
Tel Aviv Open Championships; Israel 25 March 2023 CL2	Men's Sprint	(Israel) Mikhail Iakovlev	(Ukraine) Bohdan Danylchuk	(Ukraine) Vladyslav Denysenko	
Tel Aviv Open Championships; Israel 25 March 2023 CL2	Men's Keirin	(Israel) Mikhail Iakovlev	(Ukraine) Bohdan Danylchuk	(Ukraine) Vladyslav Denysenko	
Tel Aviv Open Championships; Israel 25 March 2023 CL2	Men's Omnium	(Israel) Rotem Tene	(Israel) Alon Yogev	(Israel) Amit Keinan	
Tel Aviv Open Championships; Israel 25 March 2023 CL2	Men's Madison	(Israel) Amit Keinan (Israel) Rotem Tene	(Israel) Vladyslav Loginov (Israel) Alon Yogev	(Italy) Alessio Luca Salvadeo (Argentina) Facundo Lezica	
Silk Road Namangan II; Uzbekistan 31 March–2 April 2023 CL2
Silk Road Namangan II; Uzbekistan 31 March–2 April 2023 CL2	Team Pursuit	Kazakhstan (KAZ); Ramis Dinmukhametov; Ruslan Yelyubayev; Dmitriy Noskov; Ilya Karabotayev	Uzbekistan (UZB); Nikita Tsvetkov; Aleksey Fomovskiy; Dmitriy Bocharov; Edem Eminov	Uladzislau Yarash; Raman Ramanau; Dzianis Mazur; Raman Tsishkou	
Silk Road Namangan II; Uzbekistan 31 March–2 April 2023 CL2	Team Pursuit	Uzbekistan (UZB); Olga Zabelinskaya; Yanina Kuskova; Margarita Misyurina; Nafosat Kozieva	Uzbekistan (UZB); Evgeniya Golotina; Shahnoza Abdullaeva; Ekaterina Knebeleva; Madina Kakhorova	Uzbekistan (UZB); Sevinch Yuldasheva; Kseniya Li; Mohinabonu Elmurodova; Asal Rizayeva	
Silk Road Namangan II; Uzbekistan 31 March–2 April 2023 CL2	Madison	Dzianis Mazur; Raman Tsishkou	Kirill Malkov; Aleksandr Ivanov	(Kazakhstan) Ramis Dinmukhametov (Kazakhstan) Dmitriy Noskov	
Silk Road Namangan II; Uzbekistan 31 March–2 April 2023 CL2	Madison	(Uzbekistan) Olga Zabelinskaya (Uzbekistan) Margarita Misyurina	(Uzbekistan) Nafosat Kozieva (Uzbekistan) Ekaterina Knebeleva	Karalina Biruk; Anastasiya Koleseva	
Silk Road Namangan II; Uzbekistan 31 March–2 April 2023 CL2	Omnium	Raman Tsishkou	(Kazakhstan) Ilya Karabutayev	(Kazakhstan) Ruslan Elyubayev	
Silk Road Namangan II; Uzbekistan 31 March–2 April 2023 CL2	Omnium	(Uzbekistan) Olga Zabelinskaya	(Uzbekistan) Margarita Misyurina	Karolina Biryuk	
Silk Road Namangan II; Uzbekistan 31 March–2 April 2023 CL2	Sprint	(Hong Kong) Cheuk Hei To	(Kazakhstan) Kiril Kurdidi	Andrey Shevtsov	
Silk Road Namangan II; Uzbekistan 31 March–2 April 2023 CL2	Sprint	(Hong Kong) Yeung Cho-yiu	(Hong Kong) Sze Wing Ng	(Hong Kong) Phoebe Tung	
Silk Road Namangan II; Uzbekistan 31 March–2 April 2023 CL2	Team Sprint	Hong Kong (HKG); Mok Tsz Chun; Cheuk Hei To; Tsun Ho Yung	Sergey Demianov; Maksim Bunkov; Aleksey Kozubenko	Gleb Burdigin; Andrey Shevtsov; Aleksandr Babyuk	
Silk Road Namangan II; Uzbekistan 31 March–2 April 2023 CL2	Team Sprint	Hong Kong (HKG); Phoebe Tung; Yiu Cho Yeung; Sze Wing Ng	Uzbekistan (UZB); Sabina Zoxidova; Anastasia Safonova; Diana Irmatova		
Silk Road Namangan II; Uzbekistan 31 March–2 April 2023 CL2	Keirin	(Hong Kong) Cheuk Hei To	(Hong Kong) Tsun Ho Yung	(Kazakhstan) Kirill Kurdidi	
Silk Road Namangan II; Uzbekistan 31 March–2 April 2023 CL2	Keirin	(Hong Kong) Yeung Cho-yiu	(Hong Kong) Phoebe Tung	(Hong Kong) Sze Wing Ng	
Silk Road Namangan II; Uzbekistan 31 March–2 April 2023 CL2	Points Race	Raman Ramanau	(Hong Kong) Tsun Wai Chu	(Uzbekistan) Davirjan Abdurakhmanov	
Silk Road Namangan II; Uzbekistan 31 March–2 April 2023 CL2	Points Race	(Uzbekistan) Olga Zabelinskaya	(Uzbekistan) Yanina Kuskova	(Uzbekistan) Asal Rizaeva	
Silk Road Namangan II; Uzbekistan 31 March–2 April 2023 CL2	Elimination Race	(Kazakhstan) Ramis Dinmukhametov	Dzianis Mazur	Vladislav Gutovskii	
Silk Road Namangan II; Uzbekistan 31 March–2 April 2023 CL2	Elimination Race	(Uzbekistan) Margarita Misyurina	Anastasiya Kolesava	Karalina Biruk	
Silk Road Namangan II; Uzbekistan 31 March–2 April 2023 CL2	Scratch	(Kazakhstan) Ruslan Yelyubayev	(Kazakhstan) Ramis Dinmukhametov	Dzianis Mazur	
Silk Road Namangan II; Uzbekistan 31 March–2 April 2023 CL2	Scratch	Karalina Biruk	(Uzbekistan) Yanina Kuskova	(Uzbekistan) Ekaterina Knebeleva	
Easter International Grand Prix I Trinidad and Tobago 7–8 April 2023 CL2
Easter International Grand Prix I Trinidad and Tobago 7–8 April 2023 CL2	Elimination Race	(Trinidad and Tobago) Adam Alexander	(Trinidad and Tobago) Akil Campbell	(Barbados) Jamol Eastmond	
Easter International Grand Prix I Trinidad and Tobago 7–8 April 2023 CL2	Elimination Race	(Brazil) Ana Paula Cassetta	(Trinidad and Tobago) Alexi Ramirez	(Brazil) Gisele Saggioro Gasparotto	
Easter International Grand Prix I Trinidad and Tobago 7–8 April 2023 CL2	Keirin	(Brazil) Flávio Cipriano	(Brazil) João Vitor da Silva	(Trinidad and Tobago) Quincy Alexander	
Easter International Grand Prix I Trinidad and Tobago 7–8 April 2023 CL2	Keirin	(Jamaica) Dahlia Palmer	(Suriname) Tachana Dalger	(Trinidad and Tobago) Alexi Ramirez	
Easter International Grand Prix I Trinidad and Tobago 7–8 April 2023 CL2	Scratch	(Trinidad and Tobago) Tariq Woods	(Jamaica) Andrew Ramsay	(United States) Gonzalo Olivos	
Easter International Grand Prix I Trinidad and Tobago 7–8 April 2023 CL2	Scratch	(Brazil) Wellyda Rodrigues	(Mexico) María Gaxiola	(Trinidad and Tobago) Alexi Ramirez	
Easter International Grand Prix I Trinidad and Tobago 7–8 April 2023 CL2	Points Race	(Trinidad and Tobago) Akil Campbell	(Barbados) Edwin Sutherland	(Trinidad and Tobago) Liam Trepte	
Easter International Grand Prix I Trinidad and Tobago 7–8 April 2023 CL2	Points Race	(Mexico) María Gaxiola	(Trinidad and Tobago) Alexi Ramirez	(Brazil) Amanda Kunkel	
Easter International Grand Prix II; Trinidad and Tobago 9 April 2023 CL1
Easter International Grand Prix II; Trinidad and Tobago 9 April 2023 CL1	Women's Madison	(Brazil) Wellyda Rodrigues (Brazil) Alice Leite	(Trinidad and Tobago) Alexi Ramirez (Mexico) María Gaxiola	(Brazil) Ana Paula Casetta (Brazil) Amanda Kunkel	
Easter International Grand Prix II; Trinidad and Tobago 9 April 2023 CL1	Omnium	(Trinidad and Tobago) Akil Campbell	(Barbados) Edwin Sutherland	(Barbados) Jamol Eastmond	
Easter International Grand Prix II; Trinidad and Tobago 9 April 2023 CL1	Omnium	(Mexico) María Gaxiola	(Brazil) Wellyda Rodrigues	(Trinidad and Tobago) Alexi Ramirez	
Easter International Grand Prix II; Trinidad and Tobago 9 April 2023 CL1	Sprint	(Brazil) João Vitor da Silva	(Brazil) Flávio Cipriano	(Trinidad and Tobago) Devante Laurence	
Easter International Grand Prix II; Trinidad and Tobago 9 April 2023 CL1	Sprint	(Jamaica) Dahlia Palmer	(Suriname) Tachana Dalger	(Trinidad and Tobago) Phoebe Sandy	
Belgian Open Track Meeting; Belgium 14–16 April 2023 CL1
Belgian Open Track Meeting; Belgium 14–16 April 2023 CL1	Men's Individual Pursuit	(Belgium) Noah Vandenbranden	(Belgium) Thibaut Bernard	(Belgium) Brem Deman	
Belgian Open Track Meeting; Belgium 14–16 April 2023 CL1	Keirin	(France) Sébastien Vigier	(Malaysia) Muhammad Shah Firdaus Sahrom	(Italy) Luca Priore	
Belgian Open Track Meeting; Belgium 14–16 April 2023 CL1	Keirin	(France) Taky Marie-Divine Kouamé	(Belgium) Nicky Degrendele	(Ukraine) Oleksandra Lohviniuk	
Belgian Open Track Meeting; Belgium 14–16 April 2023 CL1	Women's Points Race	(France) Valentine Fortin	(Germany) Lea Lin Teutenberg	(Poland) Daria Pikulik	
Belgian Open Track Meeting; Belgium 14–16 April 2023 CL1	Scratch	(France) Donavan Grondin	(Netherlands) Yanne Dorenbos	(France) Valentin Tabellion	
Belgian Open Track Meeting; Belgium 14–16 April 2023 CL1	Scratch	(France) Victoire Berteau	(Poland) Daria Pikulik	(United Kingdom) Sophie Lewis	
Belgian Open Track Meeting; Belgium 14–16 April 2023 CL1	Sprint	(France) Sébastien Vigier	(France) Tom Derache	(Italy) Stefano Moro	
Belgian Open Track Meeting; Belgium 14–16 April 2023 CL1	Sprint	(Ukraine) Olena Starikova	(France) Taky Marie-Divine Kouamé	(Belgium) Nicky Degrendele	
Belgian Open Track Meeting; Belgium 14–16 April 2023 CL1	Madison	(France) Donavan Grondin (France) Benjamin Thomas	(France) Thomas Boudat (France) Valentin Tabellion	(Netherlands) Yoeri Havik (Netherlands) Vincent Hoppezak	
Belgian Open Track Meeting; Belgium 14–16 April 2023 CL1	Madison	(France) Victoire Berteau (France) Marion Borras	(Poland) Wiktoria Pikulik (Poland) Daria Pikulik	(Netherlands) Daniek Hengeveld (Netherlands) Maike van der Duin	
Belgian Open Track Meeting; Belgium 14–16 April 2023 CL1	Omnium	(France) Donavan Grondin	(France) Benjamin Thomas	(France) Thomas Boudat	
Belgian Open Track Meeting; Belgium 14–16 April 2023 CL1	Omnium	(France) Valentine Fortin	(France) Victoire Berteau	(France) Marion Borras	
2023 UCI Track Cycling Nations Cup Round 3 Canada 20–23 April 2023 CDM
2023 UCI Track Cycling Nations Cup Round 3 Canada 20–23 April 2023 CDM	Sprint	(Trinidad and Tobago) Nicholas Paul	(Poland) Mateusz Rudyk	(Australia) Matthew Richardson	
2023 UCI Track Cycling Nations Cup Round 3 Canada 20–23 April 2023 CDM	Sprint	(Canada) Kelsey Mitchell	(Colombia) Martha Bayona	(Mexico) Daniela Gaxiola	
2023 UCI Track Cycling Nations Cup Round 3 Canada 20–23 April 2023 CDM	Keirin	(Australia) Matthew Richardson	(Germany) Maximilian Dörnbach	(Trinidad and Tobago) Nicholas Paul	
2023 UCI Track Cycling Nations Cup Round 3 Canada 20–23 April 2023 CDM	Keirin	(Germany) Alessa-Catriona Pröpster	(Colombia) Martha Bayona	(United Kingdom) Katy Marchant	
2023 UCI Track Cycling Nations Cup Round 3 Canada 20–23 April 2023 CDM	Omnium	(France) Donavan Grondin	(Germany) Tim Torn Teutenberg	(Netherlands) Jan-Willem van Schip	
2023 UCI Track Cycling Nations Cup Round 3 Canada 20–23 April 2023 CDM	Omnium	(United Kingdom) Katie Archibald	(Italy) Elisa Balsamo	(United States) Jennifer Valente	
2023 UCI Track Cycling Nations Cup Round 3 Canada 20–23 April 2023 CDM	Elimination Race	(Netherlands) Matthijs Büchli	(Australia) Blake Agnoletto	(Spain) Erik Martorell	
2023 UCI Track Cycling Nations Cup Round 3 Canada 20–23 April 2023 CDM	Elimination Race	(Norway) Anita Stenberg	(United States) Jennifer Valente	(Netherlands) Maike van der Duin	
2023 UCI Track Cycling Nations Cup Round 3 Canada 20–23 April 2023 CDM	Team Sprint	Australia (AUS); Matthew Glaetzer; Leigh Hoffman; Matthew Richardson	China (CHN); Guo Shuai; Chenxi Xue; Yu Zhou	Great Britain (GBR); Harry Ledingham-Horn; Ed Lowe; Hayden Norris	
2023 UCI Track Cycling Nations Cup Round 3 Canada 20–23 April 2023 CDM	Team Sprint	Mexico (MEX); Daniela Gaxiola; Jessica Salazar; Yuli Verdugo	Canada (CAN); Lauriane Genest; Kelsey Mitchell; Sarah Orban	Poland (POL); Marlena Karwacka; Urszula Łoś; Nikola Sibiak	
2023 UCI Track Cycling Nations Cup Round 3 Canada 20–23 April 2023 CDM	Team Pursuit	Great Britain (GBR); Oliver Wood; Daniel Bigham; Josh Charlton; Michael Gill	Italy (ITA); Francesco Lamon; Michele Scartezzini; Davide Boscaro; Manlio Moro	France (FRA); Donavan Grondin; Benjamin Thomas; Thomas Boudat; Valentin Tabellion	
2023 UCI Track Cycling Nations Cup Round 3 Canada 20–23 April 2023 CDM	Team Pursuit	Great Britain (GBR); Katie Archibald; Neah Evans; Megan Barker; Josie Knight	Germany (GER); Lena Charlotte Reißner; Franziska Brauße; Mieke Kröger; Laura Süßemilch	Canada (CAN) A Sarah van Dam; Maggie Coles-Lyster; Erin Attwell; Ariane Bonhomme	
2023 UCI Track Cycling Nations Cup Round 3 Canada 20–23 April 2023 CDM	Madison	(Portugal) Ivo Oliveira (Portugal) Iúri Leitão	(Netherlands) Yoeri Havik (Netherlands) Vincent Hoppezak	(France) Thomas Boudat (France) Benjamin Thomas	
2023 UCI Track Cycling Nations Cup Round 3 Canada 20–23 April 2023 CDM	Madison	(Belgium) Shari Bossuyt (Belgium) Lotte Kopecky	(United Kingdom) Katie Archibald (Netherlands) Neah Evans	(Italy) Elisa Balsamo (Italy) Martina Fidanza	
Speed Paradise Grand Prix; Trinidad and Tobago 26–27 April 2023 CL2
Speed Paradise Grand Prix; Trinidad and Tobago 26–27 April 2023 CL2	Elimination Race	(Trinidad and Tobago) Akil Campbell	(Barbados) Edwin Sutherland	(Barbados) Jamol Eastmond	
Speed Paradise Grand Prix; Trinidad and Tobago 26–27 April 2023 CL2	Elimination Race	(Barbados) Amber Joseph	(Mexico) María Gaxiola	(Suriname) Tachana Dalger	
Speed Paradise Grand Prix; Trinidad and Tobago 26–27 April 2023 CL2	Keirin	(New Zealand) Callum Saunders	(Trinidad and Tobago) Kwesi Browne	(Canada) James Hedgcock	
Speed Paradise Grand Prix; Trinidad and Tobago 26–27 April 2023 CL2	Keirin	(United Kingdom) Iona Moir	(Jamaica) Dahlia Palmer	(United Kingdom) Rhianna Parris-Smith	
Speed Paradise Grand Prix; Trinidad and Tobago 26–27 April 2023 CL2	Sprint	(Trinidad and Tobago) Nicholas Paul	(New Zealand) Callum Saunders	(Trinidad and Tobago) Kwesi Browne	
Speed Paradise Grand Prix; Trinidad and Tobago 26–27 April 2023 CL2	Sprint	(United Kingdom) Iona Moir	(Jamaica) Dahlia Palmer	(United Kingdom) Rhianna Parris-Smith	
Speed Paradise Grand Prix; Trinidad and Tobago 26–27 April 2023 CL2	Omnium	(Trinidad and Tobago) Akil Campbell	(Barbados) Edwin Sutherland	(Barbados) Jamol Eastmond	
Speed Paradise Grand Prix; Trinidad and Tobago 26–27 April 2023 CL2	Omnium	(Mexico) Yareli Acevedo	(Barbados) Amber Joseph	(Mexico) María Gaxiola	
Speed Paradise Grand Prix; Trinidad and Tobago 26–27 April 2023 CL2	Scratch	(United States) Daniel Breuer	(Trinidad and Tobago) Akil Campbell	(Barbados) Jamol Eastmond	
Speed Paradise Grand Prix; Trinidad and Tobago 26–27 April 2023 CL2	Scratch	(Mexico) María Gaxiola	(Barbados) Amber Joseph	(Trinidad and Tobago) Alexis Ramirez	
Athens Track Grand Prix 2023; Greece 28–29 April 2023 CL2
Athens Track Grand Prix 2023; Greece 28–29 April 2023 CL2	Elimination Race	(Kazakhstan) Artyom Zakharov	(Poland) Konrad Waliniak	(United Kingdom) Callum Twelves	
Athens Track Grand Prix 2023; Greece 28–29 April 2023 CL2	Elimination Race	(United Kingdom) Dannielle Khan	(Republic of Ireland) Aoife O'Brien	(United Kingdom) Lucy Nelson	
Athens Track Grand Prix 2023; Greece 28–29 April 2023 CL2	Keirin	(Kazakhstan) Sergey Ponomaryov	(Greece) Ioannis Kalogeropoulos	(Greece) Miltiadis Charovas	
Athens Track Grand Prix 2023; Greece 28–29 April 2023 CL2	Keirin	(United Kingdom) Dannielle Khan	(Greece) Ioanna Plega-Gavrilaki	(Greece) Aikaterini Chatzistefani	
Athens Track Grand Prix 2023; Greece 28–29 April 2023 CL2	Men's Sprint	(Kazakhstan) Andrey Chugay	(Hungary) Norbert Szabo	(Kazakhstan) Sergey Ponomaryov	
Athens Track Grand Prix 2023; Greece 28–29 April 2023 CL2	Team Sprint	Greece (GRE); Spyridon Theocharis; Alexandros Polyderopoulos; Alexios Magklaris	Turkey (TUR); Mustafa Said Erdemli; Ali Küçük; Muhammed Ali Sunbul	Greece (GRE); Petros Gkazonis; Gerasimos Spiliotopoulos; Dimitrios Voukelatos	
Athens Track Grand Prix 2023; Greece 28–29 April 2023 CL2	Team Sprint	Greece (GRE); Eleni Kokoliou; Ioanna Plega-Gavrilaki (France) Lou Dolez	Greece (GRE); Konstantina Karlou; Aikaterini Panagiotakopoulou; Despoina Tourli	Greece (GRE); Anastasia Maria Bairaktari; Dimitra Bakathanasi; Aikaterini Chatzistefani	
Athens Track Grand Prix 2023; Greece 28–29 April 2023 CL2	Scratch	(Poland) Adam Woźniak	(Kazakhstan) Artyom Zakharov	(United Kingdom) Kieran Riley	
Athens Track Grand Prix 2023; Greece 28–29 April 2023 CL2	Scratch	(Greece) Argiro Milaki	(United Kingdom) Lucy Nelson	(Italy) Valentina Scandolara	
Athens Track Grand Prix 2023; Greece 28–29 April 2023 CL2	Omnium	(Kazakhstan) Ramis Dinmukhametov	(Kazakhstan) Artyom Zakharov	(Poland) Adam Woźniak	
Athens Track Grand Prix 2023; Greece 28–29 April 2023 CL2	Omnium	(Greece) Argiro Milaki	(United Kingdom) Lucy Nelson	(Republic of Ireland) Aoife O'Brien	
Athens Track Grand Prix 2023; Greece 28–29 April 2023 CL2	Men's Madison	(Kazakhstan) Ramis Dinmukhametov (Kazakhstan) Artyom Zakharov	(Poland) Adam Woźniak (United Kingdom) Kieran Riley	(Poland) Dominik Ratajczak (Poland) Konrad Waliniak	
Carnival Of Speed Grand Prix; Trinidad and Tobago 29–30 April 2023 CL2
Carnival Of Speed Grand Prix; Trinidad and Tobago 29–30 April 2023 CL2	Elimination Race	(Barbados) Edwin Sutherland	(Barbados) Jamol Eastmond	(United States) Daniel Breuer	
Carnival Of Speed Grand Prix; Trinidad and Tobago 29–30 April 2023 CL2	Elimination Race	(Mexico) María Gaxiola	(Barbados) Amber Joseph	(Trinidad and Tobago) Alexi Ramirez	
Carnival Of Speed Grand Prix; Trinidad and Tobago 29–30 April 2023 CL2	Keirin	(New Zealand) Callum Saunders	(Trinidad and Tobago) Kwesi Browne	(Colombia) Fabián Puerta	
Carnival Of Speed Grand Prix; Trinidad and Tobago 29–30 April 2023 CL2	Keirin	(United Kingdom) Iona Moir	(Suriname) Tachana Dalger	(Jamaica) Dahlia Palmer	
Carnival Of Speed Grand Prix; Trinidad and Tobago 29–30 April 2023 CL2	Sprint	(Trinidad and Tobago) Nicholas Paul	(New Zealand) Callum Saunders	(Canada) Ryan Dodyk	
Carnival Of Speed Grand Prix; Trinidad and Tobago 29–30 April 2023 CL2	Sprint	(United Kingdom) Iona Moir	(Jamaica) Dahlia Palmer	(United Kingdom) Rhianna Parris-Smith	
Carnival Of Speed Grand Prix; Trinidad and Tobago 29–30 April 2023 CL2	Omnium	(Trinidad and Tobago) Akil Campbell	(Barbados) Jamol Eastmond	(United States) Daniel Breuer	
Carnival Of Speed Grand Prix; Trinidad and Tobago 29–30 April 2023 CL2	Omnium	(Barbados) Amber Joseph	(Mexico) Yareli Acevedo	(Trinidad and Tobago) Alexi Ramirez	
Carnival Of Speed Grand Prix; Trinidad and Tobago 29–30 April 2023 CL2	Scratch	(Barbados) Edwin Sutherland	(Trinidad and Tobago) Tariq Woods	(Barbados) Jamol Eastmond	
Carnival Of Speed Grand Prix; Trinidad and Tobago 29–30 April 2023 CL2	Scratch	(Mexico) María Gaxiola	(Barbados) Amber Joseph	(Trinidad and Tobago) Alexi Ramirez	
Tel Aviv Cup; Israel 5–6 May 2023 CL2
Tel Aviv Cup; Israel 5–6 May 2023 CL2	Omnium	(Switzerland) Dominik Bieler	(Switzerland) Raphael Clemencio	(Hungary) Bertold Drijver	
Tel Aviv Cup; Israel 5–6 May 2023 CL2	Omnium	(Lithuania) Olivija Baleišytė	(United Kingdom) Lucy Nelson	(Israel) Ori Bash Dubinski	
Tel Aviv Cup; Israel 5–6 May 2023 CL2	Madison	(Switzerland) Dominik Bieler (Switzerland) Raphael Clemencio	(Israel) Alon Yogev (Israel) Vladyslav Loginov	(Italy) Leonardo Fedrigo (Argentina) Facundo Lezica	
Tel Aviv Cup; Israel 5–6 May 2023 CL2	Madison	(Israel) Ori Bash Dubinski (Lithuania) Olivija Baleišytė	(United Kingdom) Lucy Nelson (Israel) Noa Shweky	(Netherlands) Yilla Threels (Denmark) Ida Krum	
Tel Aviv Cup; Israel 5–6 May 2023 CL2	Sprint	(Israel) Mikhail Iakovlev	(United Kingdom) Niall Monks	(Latvia) Ainārs Ķiksis	
Tel Aviv Cup; Israel 5–6 May 2023 CL2	Sprint	(Republic of Ireland) Orla Walsh	(Lithuania) Olivija Baleišytė	(United Kingdom) Lucy Nelson	
Tel Aviv Cup; Israel 5–6 May 2023 CL2	Keirin	(Israel) Mikhail Iakovlev	(Latvia) Ainārs Ķiksis	(United Kingdom) Niall Monks	
Tel Aviv Cup; Israel 5–6 May 2023 CL2	Keirin	(Republic of Ireland) Orla Walsh	(Lithuania) Olivija Baleišytė	(Denmark) Ida Krum	
1. Lauf Brandenburger SprintCup 2023; Germany 5–6 May 2023 CL1
1. Lauf Brandenburger SprintCup 2023; Germany 5–6 May 2023 CL1	Keirin	(Poland) Patryk Rajkowski	(Czech Republic) Dominik Topinka	(Czech Republic) Martin Čechman	
1. Lauf Brandenburger SprintCup 2023; Germany 5–6 May 2023 CL1	Keirin	(Poland) Nikola Sibiak	(Poland) Marlena Karwacka	(Czech Republic) Veronika Jaborníková	
1. Lauf Brandenburger SprintCup 2023; Germany 5–6 May 2023 CL1	Sprint	(Hungary) Sándor Szalontay	(Israel) Matěj Bohuslávek	(Czech Republic) Martin Čechman	
1. Lauf Brandenburger SprintCup 2023; Germany 5–6 May 2023 CL1	Sprint	(Germany) Clara Schneider	(Ukraine) Oleksandra Lohviniuk	(Poland) Paulina Petri	
GP Framar; Czech Republic 12–13 May 2023 CL1
GP Framar; Czech Republic 12–13 May 2023 CL1	Keirin	(Poland) Patryk Rajkowski	(Italy) Stefano Moro	(Hungary) Sándor Szalontay	
GP Framar; Czech Republic 12–13 May 2023 CL1	Keirin	(Italy) Miriam Vece	(Poland) Marlena Karwacka	(Poland) Urszula Łoś	
GP Framar; Czech Republic 12–13 May 2023 CL1	Omnium	(Kazakhstan) Artyom Zakharov	(Ukraine) Roman Gladysh	(Latvia) George Nemilostivijs	
GP Framar; Czech Republic 12–13 May 2023 CL1	Omnium	(Australia) Georgia Baker	(Czech Republic) Petra Ševčíková	(Lithuania) Olivija Baleišytė	
GP Framar; Czech Republic 12–13 May 2023 CL1	Points Race	(Poland) Filip Prokopyszyn	(Netherlands) Philip Heijnen	(Austria) Felix Ritzinger	
GP Framar; Czech Republic 12–13 May 2023 CL1	Points Race	(Australia) Georgia Baker	(Lithuania) Olivija Baleišytė	(Ukraine) Tetiana Yashchenko	
GP Framar; Czech Republic 12–13 May 2023 CL1	Scratch	(Poland) Filip Prokopyszyn	(Lithuania) Rokas Adomaitis	(Netherlands) Philip Heijnen	
GP Framar; Czech Republic 12–13 May 2023 CL1	Scratch	(Ukraine) Tetiana Yashchenko	(Australia) Georgia Baker	(Greece) Argiro Milaki	
GP Framar; Czech Republic 12–13 May 2023 CL1	Sprint	(Italy) Mattia Predomo	(Lithuania) Vasilijus Lendel	(Czech Republic) Martin Čechman	
GP Framar; Czech Republic 12–13 May 2023 CL1	Sprint	(Poland) Marlena Karwacka	(Italy) Miriam Vece	(Ukraine) Oleksandra Lohviniuk	
GP Duratec; Czech Republic 14 May 2023 CL2
GP Duratec; Czech Republic 14 May 2023 CL2	Omnium	(Netherlands) Philip Heijnen	(Latvia) George Nemilostivijs	(Germany) Benjamin Boos	
GP Duratec; Czech Republic 14 May 2023 CL2	Omnium	(Australia) Georgia Baker	(Austria) Verena Eberhardt	(Lithuania) Olivija Baleišytė	
GP Duratec; Czech Republic 14 May 2023 CL2	Sprint	(Italy) Mattia Predomo	(Czech Republic) Dominik Topinka	(Hungary) Sándor Szalontay	
GP Duratec; Czech Republic 14 May 2023 CL2	Sprint	(Poland) Marlena Karwacka	(Poland) Paulina Petri	(Poland) Nikola Sibiak	
500+1 kolo: Embedded UCI races Czech Republic 16–18 May 2023 CL2
500+1 kolo: Embedded UCI races Czech Republic 16–18 May 2023 CL2	Elimination Race	(Germany) Malte Maschke	(Ukraine) Maksym Vasilyev	(Czech Republic) Štěpán Široký	
500+1 kolo: Embedded UCI races Czech Republic 16–18 May 2023 CL2	Elimination Race	(Czech Republic) Petra Ševčíková	(Poland) Patrycja Lorkowska	(Slovakia) Alžbeta Bačíková	
500+1 kolo: Embedded UCI races Czech Republic 16–18 May 2023 CL2	Points Race	(Germany) Moritz Malcharek	(Israel) Alon Yogev	(Czech Republic) Adam Křenek	
500+1 kolo: Embedded UCI races Czech Republic 16–18 May 2023 CL2	Points Race	(Czech Republic) Petra Ševčíková	(Poland) Patrycja Lorkowska	(Slovakia) Alžbeta Bačíková	
500+1 kolo: Embedded UCI races Czech Republic 16–18 May 2023 CL2	Scratch	(Ukraine) Roman Gladysh	(Germany) Benjamin Boos	(Slovakia) Martin Chren	
500+1 kolo: Embedded UCI races Czech Republic 16–18 May 2023 CL2	Scratch	(Czech Republic) Petra Ševčíková	(Slovakia) Alžbeta Bačíková	(Czech Republic) Barbora Němcová	
Silk Way Series Astana I Kazakhstan 20–21 May 2023 CL2
Silk Way Series Astana I Kazakhstan 20–21 May 2023 CL2	Elimination Race	(Kazakhstan) Ruslan Yelyubayev	(United Arab Emirates) Ahmed Al-Mansouri	(Kazakhstan) Ramis Dinmukhametov	
Silk Way Series Astana I Kazakhstan 20–21 May 2023 CL2	Elimination Race	(Lithuania) Olivija Baleišytė	(Kazakhstan) Dariya Kazakbay	(Kazakhstan) Kristina Stuzhuk	
Silk Way Series Astana I Kazakhstan 20–21 May 2023 CL2	Sprint	(Kazakhstan) Andrey Chugay	(Lithuania) Justas Beniušis	(Lithuania) Laurynas Vinskas	
Silk Way Series Astana I Kazakhstan 20–21 May 2023 CL2	Sprint	(Kazakhstan) Yuliya Golubkova	(Iran) Fatemeh Hadavand	(Iran) Setareh Zargar	
Silk Way Series Astana I Kazakhstan 20–21 May 2023 CL2	Keirin	(Kazakhstan) Andrey Chugay	(Kazakhstan) Sergey Ponomaryov	(Kazakhstan) Dmitriy Rezanov	
Silk Way Series Astana I Kazakhstan 20–21 May 2023 CL2	Keirin	(Kazakhstan) Yuliya Golubkova	(Iran) Fatemeh Hadavand	(Iran) Setareh Zargar	
Silk Way Series Astana I Kazakhstan 20–21 May 2023 CL2	Men's Time Trial	(Iran) Mohammad Rahimabadi	(Iran) Amir Ali Alizadeh	(Kazakhstan) Maxim Kotlyar	
Silk Way Series Astana I Kazakhstan 20–21 May 2023 CL2	Omnium	(Kazakhstan) Ramis Dinmukhametov	(Kazakhstan) Artyom Zakharov	(Kazakhstan) Alisher Zhumakan	
Silk Way Series Astana I Kazakhstan 20–21 May 2023 CL2	Omnium	(Kazakhstan) Rinata Sultanova	(Uzbekistan) Margarita Misyurina	(Lithuania) Olivija Baleišytė	
Silk Way Series Astana I Kazakhstan 20–21 May 2023 CL2	Madison	(Kazakhstan) Ramis Dinmukhametov (Kazakhstan) Artyom Zakharov	(Kazakhstan) Ruslan Yelyubayev (Kazakhstan) Maxim Khoroshavin	(Kazakhstan) Dmitriy Noskov (Kazakhstan) Ilya Karabutov	
Silk Way Series Astana I Kazakhstan 20–21 May 2023 CL2	Madison	(Kazakhstan) Anzhela Solovyeva (Kazakhstan) Svetlana Pachshenko	(Uzbekistan) Margarita Misyurina (Uzbekistan) Ekaterina Knebeleva	(Kazakhstan) Dariya Kazakbay (Kazakhstan) Aruzhan Rakhmzhan	
Silk Way Series Astana II; Kazakhstan 22 May 2023 CL2
Silk Way Series Astana II; Kazakhstan 22 May 2023 CL2	Sprint	(Kazakhstan) Andrey Chugay	(Kazakhstan) Dmitriy Rezanov	(Kazakhstan) Ramazan Mukhtar	
Silk Way Series Astana II; Kazakhstan 22 May 2023 CL2	Sprint	(Kazakhstan) Yuliya Golubkova	(Iran) Fatemeh Hadavand	(Iran) Setareh Zargar	
Silk Way Series Astana II; Kazakhstan 22 May 2023 CL2	Keirin	(Kazakhstan) Sergey Ponomaryov	(Kazakhstan) Dmitriy Rezanov	(Lithuania) Laurynas Vinskas	
Silk Way Series Astana II; Kazakhstan 22 May 2023 CL2	Keirin	(Iran) Fatemeh Hadavand	(Kazakhstan) Yuliya Golubkova	(Iran) Maedeh Nazari	
Silk Way Series Astana II; Kazakhstan 22 May 2023 CL2	Omnium	(Kazakhstan) Ilya Karabutov	(Kazakhstan) Ruslan Yelyubayev	(Kazakhstan) Sergey Karmazhakov	
Silk Way Series Astana II; Kazakhstan 22 May 2023 CL2	Omnium	(Lithuania) Olivija Baleišytė	(Uzbekistan) Margarita Misyurina	(Kazakhstan) Anzhela Solovyeva	
2023 Hong Kong International Track Cup I Hong Kong 26 May 2023 CL1
2023 Hong Kong International Track Cup I Hong Kong 26 May 2023 CL1	Sprint	(Malaysia) Azizulhasni Awang	(Chinese Taipei) Kang Shih-feng	(Malaysia) Muhammad Shah Firdaus Sahrom	
2023 Hong Kong International Track Cup I Hong Kong 26 May 2023 CL1	Sprint	(Malaysia) Nurul Izzah Izzati Mohd Asri	(South Korea) Park Ji-Hae	(South Korea) Kim Ha-eun	
2023 Hong Kong International Track Cup I Hong Kong 26 May 2023 CL1	Madison	(Kazakhstan) Ramis Dinmukhametov (Kazakhstan) Artyom Zakharov	(Hong Kong) Tsun Wai Chu (Hong Kong) Leung Ka Yu	(United Arab Emirates) Yousif Mirza (United Arab Emirates) Ahmed Al-Mansouri	
2023 Hong Kong International Track Cup I Hong Kong 26 May 2023 CL1	Madison	(South Korea) Lee Ju-mi (South Korea) Na A-reum	(Hong Kong) Lee Sze Wing (Hong Kong) Yang Qianyu	(Hong Kong) Leung Bo Yee (Hong Kong) Wing Yee Leung	
2023 Hong Kong International Track Cup I Hong Kong 26 May 2023 CL1	Omnium	(Kazakhstan) Artyom Zakharov	(Romania) Daniel Crista	(Hong Kong) Leung Ka Yu	
2023 Hong Kong International Track Cup I Hong Kong 26 May 2023 CL1	Omnium	(Hong Kong) Lee Sze Wing	(Indonesia) Ayustina Delia Priatna	(Uzbekistan) Margarita Misyurina	
2023 Hong Kong International Track Cup I Hong Kong 26 May 2023 CL1	Keirin	(Malaysia) Azizulhasni Awang	(Chinese Taipei) Kang Shih-feng	(Kazakhstan) Sergey Ponomaryov	
2023 Hong Kong International Track Cup I Hong Kong 26 May 2023 CL1	Keirin	(South Korea) Lee Hye-jin	(Malaysia) Nurul Izzah Izzati Mohd Asri	(South Korea) Cho Sun-young	
2023 Hong Kong International Track Cup II; Hong Kong 27–28 May 2023 CL1
2023 Hong Kong International Track Cup II; Hong Kong 27–28 May 2023 CL1	Sprint	(Malaysia) Azizulhasni Awang	(South Korea) Kang Seo-jun	(Malaysia) Muhammad Fadhil Mohd Zonis	
2023 Hong Kong International Track Cup II; Hong Kong 27–28 May 2023 CL1	Sprint	(South Korea) Lee Hye-jin	(South Korea) Cho Sun-young	(Malaysia) Nurul Izzah Izzati Mohd Asri	
2023 Hong Kong International Track Cup II; Hong Kong 27–28 May 2023 CL1	Keirin	(Malaysia) Azizulhasni Awang	(Kazakhstan) Sergey Ponomaryov	(Malaysia) Mohd Akmal Nazimi Jusena	
2023 Hong Kong International Track Cup II; Hong Kong 27–28 May 2023 CL1	Keirin	(South Korea) Lee Hye-jin	(South Korea) Kim Ha-eun	(South Korea) Cho Sun-young	
2023 Hong Kong International Track Cup II; Hong Kong 27–28 May 2023 CL1	Scratch	(Hong Kong) Leung Ka Yu	(Kazakhstan) Ilya Karabutov	(Hong Kong) Tsun Wai Chu	
2023 Hong Kong International Track Cup II; Hong Kong 27–28 May 2023 CL1	Scratch	(South Korea) Shin Jie-un	(Hong Kong) Yang Qianyu	(Hong Kong) Lee Sze Wing	
2023 Hong Kong International Track Cup II; Hong Kong 27–28 May 2023 CL1	Individual Pursuit	(Kazakhstan) Dmitriy Noskov	(Hong Kong) Pak Hang Ng	(Chinese Taipei) Sheng Chang-chih	
2023 Hong Kong International Track Cup II; Hong Kong 27–28 May 2023 CL1	Individual Pursuit	(Hong Kong) Yang Qianyu	(Hong Kong) Leung Bo Yee	(Macau) Hoi Ian Au	
2023 Hong Kong International Track Cup II; Hong Kong 27–28 May 2023 CL1	Madison	(Kazakhstan) Ramis Dinmukhametov (Kazakhstan) Artyom Zakharov	(Hong Kong) Tsun Wai Chu (Hong Kong) Leung Chun Wing	(Hong Kong) Mow Ching Yin (Hong Kong) Leung Ka Yu	
2023 Hong Kong International Track Cup II; Hong Kong 27–28 May 2023 CL1	Madison	(Hong Kong) Lee Sze Wing (Hong Kong) Yang Qianyu	(South Korea) Na A-reum (South Korea) Lee Ju-mi	(Uzbekistan) Margarita Misyurina (Uzbekistan) Ekaterina Knebeleva	
Bahnen-Tournee; Germany 27–28 May 2023 CL1
Bahnen-Tournee; Germany 27–28 May 2023 CL1	Elimination Race	(Denmark) Tobias Hansen	(Germany) Malte Maschke	(Italy) Francesco Lamon	
Bahnen-Tournee; Germany 27–28 May 2023 CL1	Elimination Race	(Italy) Letizia Paternoster	(Czech Republic) Petra Ševčíková	(Norway) Nora Tveit	
Bahnen-Tournee; Germany 27–28 May 2023 CL1	Sprint	(Germany) Maximilian Dörnbach	(Hungary) Sándor Szalontay	(Lithuania) Vasilijus Lendel	
Bahnen-Tournee; Germany 27–28 May 2023 CL1	Sprint	(Germany) Alessa-Catriona Pröpster	(France) Mathilde Gros	(Germany) Emma Hinze	
Bahnen-Tournee; Germany 27–28 May 2023 CL1	Keirin	(Germany) Maximilian Dörnbach	(Hungary) Sándor Szalontay	(Czech Republic) Martin Čechman	
Bahnen-Tournee; Germany 27–28 May 2023 CL1	Keirin	(Germany) Alessa-Catriona Pröpster	(France) Mathilde Gros	(France) Julie Michaux	
Bahnen-Tournee; Germany 27–28 May 2023 CL1	Omnium	(New Zealand) Aaron Gate	(Germany) Moritz Augenstein	(Switzerland) Simon Vitzthum	
Bahnen-Tournee; Germany 27–28 May 2023 CL1	Omnium	(Norway) Anita Stenberg	(Greece) Argiro Milaki	(Czech Republic) Petra Ševčíková	
Bahnen-Tournee; Germany 27–28 May 2023 CL1	Men's Points Race	(New Zealand) Aaron Gate	(Switzerland) Simon Vitzthum	(United States) Peter Moore	
Bahnen-Tournee; Germany 27–28 May 2023 CL1	Men's Scratch	(New Zealand) George Jackson	(South Africa) Joshua van Wyk	(Ukraine) Roman Gladysh	
Bahnen-Tournee; Germany 27–28 May 2023 CL1	Madison	(New Zealand) Tom Sexton (New Zealand) Aaron Gate	(Germany) Moritz Augenstein (Germany) Moritz Malcharek	(Austria) Maximilian Schmidbauer (Austria) Felix Ritzinger	
Bahnen-Tournee; Germany 27–28 May 2023 CL1	Madison	(Czech Republic) Petra Ševčíková (Slovakia) Alžbeta Bačíková	(Switzerland) Jasmin Liechti (Switzerland) Léna Mettraux	(Spain) Laura Rodríguez Cordero (Denmark) Ellen Klinge	
Dublin Track International; Ireland 27–28 May 2023 CL2
Dublin Track International; Ireland 27–28 May 2023 CL2	Sprint	(Hungary) Norbert Szabó	(Spain) Juan Pablo Rodríguez	(Republic of Ireland) Alexander Abdul-Wahab	
Dublin Track International; Ireland 27–28 May 2023 CL2	Sprint	(Republic of Ireland) Orla Walsh	(Republic of Ireland) Lara Gillespie	(Republic of Ireland) Deirbhle Ivory	
Dublin Track International; Ireland 27–28 May 2023 CL2	Keirin	(Israel) Mikhail Iakovlev	(Hungary) Norbert Szabó	(United Kingdom) Hamish Turnbull	
Dublin Track International; Ireland 27–28 May 2023 CL2	Keirin	(Republic of Ireland) Orla Walsh	(Republic of Ireland) Deirbhle Ivory	(United Kingdom) Lucy Nelson	
Dublin Track International; Ireland 27–28 May 2023 CL2	Omnium	(Denmark) Anders Fynbo	(Argentina) Facundo Lezica	(Republic of Ireland) Aaron Wade	
Dublin Track International; Ireland 27–28 May 2023 CL2	Omnium	(Republic of Ireland) Lara Gillespie	(Republic of Ireland) Emily Kay	(United Kingdom) Lucy Nelson	
Dublin Track International; Ireland 27–28 May 2023 CL2	Men's Points Race	(Republic of Ireland) Stefan Caulfield-Dreier	(Algeria) Yacine Chalel	(Republic of Ireland) Aaron Wade	
Dublin Track International; Ireland 27–28 May 2023 CL2	Scratch	(Republic of Ireland) Aaron Wade	(Republic of Ireland) Harvey Barnes	(Algeria) Yacine Chalel	
Dublin Track International; Ireland 27–28 May 2023 CL2	Scratch	(Republic of Ireland) Annalise Murphy	(Republic of Ireland) Lara Gillespie	(United Kingdom) Lucy Nelson	
Dublin Track International; Ireland 27–28 May 2023 CL2	Women's Madison	(Republic of Ireland) Lara Gillespie (Republic of Ireland) Emily Kay	(Republic of Ireland) Erin Creighton (Republic of Ireland) Aoife O'Brien	(United Kingdom) Lucy Nelson (Republic of Ireland) Gabriella Homer	
Finale Bahnen-Tournee; Germany 29 May 2023 CL1
Finale Bahnen-Tournee; Germany 29 May 2023 CL1	Men's Elimination Race	(Germany) Moritz Augenstein	(Denmark) Tobias Hansen	(Germany) Malte Maschke	
Finale Bahnen-Tournee; Germany 29 May 2023 CL1	Men's Sprint	(Trinidad and Tobago) Nicholas Paul	(Germany) Maximilian Dörnbach	(France) Rayan Helal	
Finale Bahnen-Tournee; Germany 29 May 2023 CL1	Keirin	(Germany) Marc Jurczyk	(France) Sébastien Vigier	(India) Esow Alben	
Finale Bahnen-Tournee; Germany 29 May 2023 CL1	Keirin	(Germany) Lea Friedrich	(Germany) Emma Hinze	(Germany) Pauline Grabosch	
Finale Bahnen-Tournee; Germany 29 May 2023 CL1	Men's Scratch	(United States) Peter Moore	(Norway) Karsten Larsen Feldmann	(New Zealand) Tom Sexton	
Finale Bahnen-Tournee; Germany 29 May 2023 CL1	Women's Omnium	(Italy) Letizia Paternoster	(Norway) Anita Stenberg	(Greece) Argiro Milaki	
Finale Bahnen-Tournee; Germany 29 May 2023 CL1	Men's Madison	(Germany) Moritz Malcharek (Germany) Moritz Augenstein	(New Zealand) Tom Sexton (New Zealand) George Jackson	(Denmark) Tobias Hansen (Denmark) Noah Wulff	
T-Town Summer Games: Festival of Speed; United States 2 June 2023 CL2
T-Town Summer Games: Festival of Speed; United States 2 June 2023 CL2	Omnium	(Venezuela) Clever Martínez	(United States) Lance Abshire	(United States) Bradley Green	
T-Town Summer Games: Festival of Speed; United States 2 June 2023 CL2	Omnium	(Mexico) Lizbeth Salazar	(United States) Kimberly Zubris	(Canada) Adèle Desgagnés	
T-Town Summer Games: Festival of Speed; United States 2 June 2023 CL2	Sprint	(Australia) Byron Davies	(Australia) James Brister	(United States) Andrew Chu	
T-Town Summer Games: Festival of Speed; United States 2 June 2023 CL2	Sprint	(Australia) Alessia McCaig	(Australia) Kalinda Robinson	(United States) Divya Verma	
Sommer Grand Prix; Denmark 4 June 2023 CL2
Sommer Grand Prix; Denmark 4 June 2023 CL2	Men's Sprint	(Spain) Alejandro Martínez	(Germany) Marcel Laurenz	(United Kingdom) Benjamin Gill	
Sommer Grand Prix; Denmark 4 June 2023 CL2	Omnium	(Denmark) Theodor Storm	(Denmark) Lasse Norman Leth	(Norway) Iver Knotten	
Sommer Grand Prix; Denmark 4 June 2023 CL2	Omnium	(Denmark) Ellen Klinge	(Norway) Nora Tveit	(Denmark) Ida Krum	
Sommer Grand Prix; Denmark 4 June 2023 CL2	Madison	(Denmark) Lasse Norman Leth (Denmark) Theodor Storm	(Denmark) Conrad Haugsted (Denmark) Robin Juel Skivild	(Czech Republic) Jan Voneš (Czech Republic) Denis Rugovac	
Sommer Grand Prix; Denmark 4 June 2023 CL2	Madison	(Denmark) Ellen Klinge (Norway) Nora Tveit	(Denmark) Ida Fialla (Switzerland) Michelle Andres	(Denmark) Tusnelda Svanholmer (United Kingdom) Miriam Jessett	
Niels Fredborgs Æresløb; Denmark 5 June 2023 CL2
Niels Fredborgs Æresløb; Denmark 5 June 2023 CL2	Men's Sprint	(Spain) Alejandro Martínez	(United Kingdom) Benjamin Gill	(Germany) Marcel Laurenz	
Niels Fredborgs Æresløb; Denmark 5 June 2023 CL2	Omnium	(Denmark) Theodor Storm	(Czech Republic) Jan Voneš	(Denmark) Lasse Norman Leth	
Niels Fredborgs Æresløb; Denmark 5 June 2023 CL2	Omnium	(United Kingdom) Miriam Jessett	(Switzerland) Michelle Andres	(Denmark) Ellen Klinge	
Niels Fredborgs Æresløb; Denmark 5 June 2023 CL2	Madison	(Denmark) Lasse Norman Leth (Denmark) Theodor Storm	(Denmark) Oskar Winkler (Denmark) Robin Juel Skivild	(Czech Republic) Jan Voneš (Czech Republic) Denis Rugovac	
Niels Fredborgs Æresløb; Denmark 5 June 2023 CL2	Madison	(Denmark) Ellen Klinge (Norway) Nora Tveit	(Netherlands) Yilla Threels (Denmark) Ida Krum	(Denmark) Ida Fialla (United Kingdom) Miriam Jessett	
T-Town Summer Games: USGP; United States 9 June 2023 CL2
T-Town Summer Games: USGP; United States 9 June 2023 CL2	Elimination Race	(Australia) Graeme Frislie	(Barbados) Jamol Eastmond	(Australia) James Moriarty	
T-Town Summer Games: USGP; United States 9 June 2023 CL2	Elimination Race	(New Zealand) Emma Cumming	(Canada) Adèle Desgagnés	(Republic of Ireland) Autumn Collins	
T-Town Summer Games: USGP; United States 9 June 2023 CL2	Keirin	(Australia) Byron Davies	(Australia) James Brister	(United States) Geneway Tang	
T-Town Summer Games: USGP; United States 9 June 2023 CL2	Keirin	(Australia) Alessia McCaig	(Australia) Kalinda Robinson	(United States) Stephanie Lawrence	
T-Town Summer Games: USGP; United States 9 June 2023 CL2	Points Race	(Australia) James Moriarty	(United States) Daniel Breuer	(United States) Lance Abshire	
T-Town Summer Games: USGP; United States 9 June 2023 CL2	Points Race	(Canada) Adèle Desgagnés	(United States) Kimberly Zubris	(New Zealand) Emma Cumming	
T-Town Summer Games: USGP; United States 9 June 2023 CL2	Scratch	(Australia) James Moriarty	(Australia) Graeme Frislie	(United States) Daniel Breuer	
T-Town Summer Games: USGP; United States 9 June 2023 CL2	Scratch	(New Zealand) Emma Cumming	(Republic of Ireland) Autumn Collins	(United States) Chelsea Borden	
Festival International de la piste Toulon Provence Méditerranée; France 9–10 June 2023 CL2
Festival International de la piste Toulon Provence Méditerranée; France 9–10 June 2023 CL2	Elimination Race	(Italy) Elia Viviani	(Italy) Michele Scartezzini	(Switzerland) Pascal Tappeiner	
Festival International de la piste Toulon Provence Méditerranée; France 9–10 June 2023 CL2	Elimination Race	(France) Aurore Pernollet	(France) Lara Lallemant	(France) Clémence Chereau	
Festival International de la piste Toulon Provence Méditerranée; France 9–10 June 2023 CL2	Keirin	(France) Rayan Helal	(France) Oscar Caron	(France) Sébastien Vigier	
Festival International de la piste Toulon Provence Méditerranée; France 9–10 June 2023 CL2	Keirin	(Italy) Giada Capobianchi	(Belgium) Zoë Wolfs	(France) Myriam Lévite	
Festival International de la piste Toulon Provence Méditerranée; France 9–10 June 2023 CL2	Sprint	(France) Rayan Helal	(France) Sébastien Vigier	(France) Timmy Gillion	
Festival International de la piste Toulon Provence Méditerranée; France 9–10 June 2023 CL2	Sprint	(Italy) Giada Capobianchi	(Belgium) Zoë Wolfs	(France) Myriam Lévite	
Festival International de la piste Toulon Provence Méditerranée; France 9–10 June 2023 CL2	Scratch	(Italy) Michele Scartezzini	(Italy) Elia Viviani	(France) Julien Robic	
Festival International de la piste Toulon Provence Méditerranée; France 9–10 June 2023 CL2	Scratch	(France) Lara Lallemant	(Republic of Ireland) Erin Grace Creighton	(Republic of Ireland) Aoife O'Brien	
GP Prešov; Slovakia 10–11 June 2023 CL1
GP Prešov; Slovakia 10–11 June 2023 CL1	Elimination Race	(Poland) Radoslaw Fratczak	(Czech Republic) Matyáš Koblížek	(Czech Republic) Štěpán Široký	
GP Prešov; Slovakia 10–11 June 2023 CL1	Elimination Race	(Republic of Ireland) Lara Gillespie	(Poland) Olga Wankiewicz	(Czech Republic) Gabriela Bártová	
GP Prešov; Slovakia 10–11 June 2023 CL1	Scratch	(Poland) Filip Prokopyszyn	(Ukraine) Maksym Vasilyev	(Poland) Kacper Majewski	
GP Prešov; Slovakia 10–11 June 2023 CL1	Scratch	(United Kingdom) Emily Kay	(Lithuania) Olivija Baleišytė	(Poland) Maja Tracka	
GP Prešov; Slovakia 10–11 June 2023 CL1	Omnium	(Czech Republic) Jan Voneš	(Poland) Kacper Majewski	(Austria) Tim Wafler	
GP Prešov; Slovakia 10–11 June 2023 CL1	Omnium	(Republic of Ireland) Lara Gillespie	(Czech Republic) Petra Ševčíková	(Lithuania) Olivija Baleišytė	
GP Prešov; Slovakia 10–11 June 2023 CL1	Points Race	(Czech Republic) Jan Voneš	(Hungary) Bertold Drijver	(Czech Republic) Adam Křenek	
GP Prešov; Slovakia 10–11 June 2023 CL1	Points Race	(Poland) Tamara Szalińska	(Czech Republic) Petra Ševčíková	(Czech Republic) Barbora Němcová	
GP Prešov; Slovakia 10–11 June 2023 CL1	Madison	(Poland) Alan Banaszek (Poland) Piotr Maslak	(Austria) Felix Ritzinger (Austria) Tim Wafler	(Poland) Filip Prokopyszyn (Poland) Wojciech Pszczolarski	
GP Prešov; Slovakia 10–11 June 2023 CL1	Madison	(Republic of Ireland) Lara Gillespie (Republic of Ireland) Alice Sharpe	(Poland) Olga Wankiewicz (Poland) Maja Tracka	(Czech Republic) Kateřina Kohoutková (Czech Republic) Petra Ševčíková	
T-Town Summer Games: Discover Lehigh Valley Superweek Part I United States 14–16 June 2023 CL1
T-Town Summer Games: Discover Lehigh Valley Superweek Part I United States 14–16 June 2023 CL1	Elimination Race	(Australia) Graeme Frislie	(Canada) Cameron Fitzmaurice	(United States) Daniel Breuer	
T-Town Summer Games: Discover Lehigh Valley Superweek Part I United States 14–16 June 2023 CL1	Elimination Race	(United States) Lily Williams	(New Zealand) Emma Cumming	(Republic of Ireland) Autumn Collins	
T-Town Summer Games: Discover Lehigh Valley Superweek Part I United States 14–16 June 2023 CL1	Keirin	(Australia) Byron Davies	(Australia) James Brister	(Australia) Sam Gallagher	
T-Town Summer Games: Discover Lehigh Valley Superweek Part I United States 14–16 June 2023 CL1	Keirin	(Australia) Alessia McCaig	(Canada) Emy Savard	(Australia) Molly McGill	
T-Town Summer Games: Discover Lehigh Valley Superweek Part I United States 14–16 June 2023 CL1	Omnium	(Australia) Graeme Frislie	(Austria) Tim Wafler	(Canada) Cameron Fitzmaurice	
T-Town Summer Games: Discover Lehigh Valley Superweek Part I United States 14–16 June 2023 CL1	Omnium	(United States) Kimberly Zubris	(New Zealand) Emma Cumming	(South Africa) Danielle van Niekerk	
T-Town Summer Games: Discover Lehigh Valley Superweek Part I United States 14–16 June 2023 CL1	Sprint	(Australia) James Brister	(Australia) Byron Davies	(Australia) Daniel Barber	
T-Town Summer Games: Discover Lehigh Valley Superweek Part I United States 14–16 June 2023 CL1	Sprint	(Australia) Alessia McCaig	(Australia) Kalinda Robinson	(United States) Divya Verma	
T-Town Summer Games: Discover Lehigh Valley Superweek Part I United States 14–16 June 2023 CL1	Team Sprint	(Australia) Byron Davies (Australia) Sam Gallagher (Australia) Maxwell Liebeknecht	(Australia) Daniel Barber (Australia) James Brister (Australia) Ryan Elliott (United States) Finn Koller	(Canada) Tyler Davies (Canada) Ryan MacDonald (Canada) Patrice St-Louis Pivin	
T-Town Summer Games: Discover Lehigh Valley Superweek Part I United States 14–16 June 2023 CL1	Team Sprint	(Canada) Emy Savard (Canada) Parmis Rabet (United States) Stephanie Lawrence	(Australia) Alessia McCaig (Australia) Molly McGill (Australia) Kalinda Robinson	(United States) Emily Schelberg (United States) Divya Verma (United States) Annika Flanigan	
T-Town Summer Games: Discover Lehigh Valley Superweek Part I United States 14–16 June 2023 CL1	Team Pursuit	(United States) Lance Abshire (Australia) Graeme Frislie (Australia) James Moriarty (United States) Daniel Breuer	(United States) Bradley Green (Canada) Emmett Culp (United States) Ryan Jastrab (United States) Anton Gibson	(Latvia) Vitālijs Korņilovs (United States) Tayne Andrade (United States) Stuart Gardner (Burkina Faso) Abdouul Imann Ouedraogo	
T-Town Summer Games: Discover Lehigh Valley Superweek Part I United States 14–16 June 2023 CL1	Team Pursuit	(United States) Kimberly Zubris (United States) Jessica Chong (Canada) Sophie MacDonald (Republic of Ireland) Autumn Collins			
T-Town Summer Games: Discover Lehigh Valley Superweek Part I United States 14–16 June 2023 CL1	Men's Individual Pursuit	(United States) Lance Abshire	(Latvia) Vitālijs Korņilovs	(United States) Tayne Andrade	
T-Town Summer Games: Discover Lehigh Valley Superweek Part I United States 14–16 June 2023 CL1	Points Race	(Australia) Graeme Frislie	(Canada) Cameron Fitzmaurice	(United States) Lance Abshire	
T-Town Summer Games: Discover Lehigh Valley Superweek Part I United States 14–16 June 2023 CL1	Points Race	(New Zealand) Emma Cumming	(United States) Kimberly Zubris	(South Africa) Danielle van Niekerk	
T-Town Summer Games: Discover Lehigh Valley Superweek Part I United States 14–16 June 2023 CL1	Scratch	(Australia) Graeme Frislie	(Austria) Tim Wafler	(United States) Daniel Breuer	
T-Town Summer Games: Discover Lehigh Valley Superweek Part I United States 14–16 June 2023 CL1	Scratch	(United States) Lily Williams	(United States) Chelsea Borden	(New Zealand) Emma Cumming	
2023 Asian Track Cycling Championships; Malaysia 14–19 June 2023 CC
2023 Asian Track Cycling Championships; Malaysia 14–19 June 2023 CC	Elimination Race	(Japan) Eiya Hashimoto	(Kazakhstan) Ramis Dinmukhametov	(Hong Kong) Leung Chun Wing	
2023 Asian Track Cycling Championships; Malaysia 14–19 June 2023 CC	Elimination Race	(Japan) Tsuyaka Uchino	(Hong Kong) Yang Qianyu	(Chinese Taipei) Huang Ting-ying	
2023 Asian Track Cycling Championships; Malaysia 14–19 June 2023 CC	Keirin	(Malaysia) Azizulhasni Awang	(Japan) Shinji Nakano	(Malaysia) Muhammad Shah Firdaus Sahrom	
2023 Asian Track Cycling Championships; Malaysia 14–19 June 2023 CC	Keirin	(Japan) Mina Sato	(Japan) Fuko Umekawa	(Japan) Riyu Ohta	
2023 Asian Track Cycling Championships; Malaysia 14–19 June 2023 CC	Omnium	(Japan) Eiya Hashimoto	(Kazakhstan) Artyom Zakharov	(South Korea) Park Sang-hoon	
2023 Asian Track Cycling Championships; Malaysia 14–19 June 2023 CC	Omnium	(Japan) Yumi Kajihara	(Hong Kong) Lee Sze Wing	(Chinese Taipei) Huang Ting-ying	
2023 Asian Track Cycling Championships; Malaysia 14–19 June 2023 CC	Sprint	(Malaysia) Azizulhasni Awang	(Japan) Kaiya Ota	(Japan) Kento Yamasaki	
2023 Asian Track Cycling Championships; Malaysia 14–19 June 2023 CC	Sprint	(Japan) Riyu Ohta	(Japan) Mina Sato	(Japan) Fuko Umekawa	
2023 Asian Track Cycling Championships; Malaysia 14–19 June 2023 CC	Team Sprint	Japan (JPN); Kaiya Ota; Yuta Obara; Yoshitaku Nagasako	China (CHN); Guo Shuai; Yu Zhou; Chenxi Xue	Malaysia (MAS); Fadhil Zonis; Muhammad Ridwan Sahrom; Umar Hasbullah	
2023 Asian Track Cycling Championships; Malaysia 14–19 June 2023 CC	Team Sprint	China (CHN); Guo Yufang; Bao Shanju; Yuan Liying	Japan (JPN); Aki Sakai; Riyu Ohta; Mina Sato	South Korea (KOR); Hwang Hyeon-seo; Lee Hye-jin; Cho Sun-young	
2023 Asian Track Cycling Championships; Malaysia 14–19 June 2023 CC	Team Pursuit	Japan (JPN); Eiya Hashimoto; Naoki Kojima; Shunsuke Imamua; Kazushige Kuboki	China (CHN); Yang Yang; Wentao Sun; Zhang Haiao; Sun Haijiao	Kazakhstan (KAZ); Artyom Zakharov; Dmitriy Noskov; Alisher Zhumakan; Ramis Dinmukhametov	
2023 Asian Track Cycling Championships; Malaysia 14–19 June 2023 CC	Team Pursuit	Japan (JPN); Yumi Kajihara; Mizuki Ikeda; Maho Kakita; Tsuyaka Uchino	China (CHN); Wang Susu; Zhang Hongjie; Wei Suwan; Wang Xiaoyue	South Korea (KOR); Shin Ji-eun; Lee Ju-mi; Na A-reum; Lee Eun-hee	
2023 Asian Track Cycling Championships; Malaysia 14–19 June 2023 CC	Individual Pursuit	(Japan) Kazushige Kuboki	(Japan) Shoi Matsuda	(China) Zhang Haiao	
2023 Asian Track Cycling Championships; Malaysia 14–19 June 2023 CC	Individual Pursuit	(China) Wei Suwan	(South Korea) Lee Ju-mi	(Japan) Maho Kakita	
2023 Asian Track Cycling Championships; Malaysia 14–19 June 2023 CC	Points Race	(Japan) Naoki Kojima	(Chinese Taipei) Chang Chih-sheng	(Hong Kong) Mow Ching Yin	
2023 Asian Track Cycling Championships; Malaysia 14–19 June 2023 CC	Points Race	(China) Liu Jiali	(Uzbekistan) Olga Zabelinskaya	(Japan) Mizuki Ikeda	
2023 Asian Track Cycling Championships; Malaysia 14–19 June 2023 CC	Scratch	(Iran) Mohammad Ganjkhanlou	(Japan) Shunsuke Imamura	(Kazakhstan) Ruslan Yelyubayev	
2023 Asian Track Cycling Championships; Malaysia 14–19 June 2023 CC	Scratch	(Japan) Yumi Kajihara	(China) Liu Jiali	(Hong Kong) Lee Sze Wing	
2023 Asian Track Cycling Championships; Malaysia 14–19 June 2023 CC	Madison	Japan (JPN); Kazushige Kuboki; Shunsuke Imamura	Hong Kong (HKG); Leung Ka Yu; Leung Chun Wing	Indonesia (INA); Bernard Van Aert; Terry Kusuma	
2023 Asian Track Cycling Championships; Malaysia 14–19 June 2023 CC	Madison	Japan (JPN); Yumi Kajihara; Tsuyaka Uchino	South Korea (KOR); Lee Ju-mi; Na A-reum	Uzbekistan (UZB); Olga Zabelinskaya; Nafosat Kozieva	
2023 Asian Track Cycling Championships; Malaysia 14–19 June 2023 CC	Time Trial	(Malaysia) Fadhil Zonis	(India) Ronaldo Laitonjam	(South Korea) Choi Woo-rim	
2023 Asian Track Cycling Championships; Malaysia 14–19 June 2023 CC	Time Trial	(China) Jiang Yulu	(Malaysia) Nurul Izzah Izzati Mohd Asri	(Japan) Aki Sakai	
2023 Pan American Track Cycling Championships; Argentina 14–18 June 2023 CC
2023 Pan American Track Cycling Championships; Argentina 14–18 June 2023 CC	Elimination Race	(Canada) Dylan Bibic	(Colombia) Fernando Gaviria	(Chile) Jacob Decar	
2023 Pan American Track Cycling Championships; Argentina 14–18 June 2023 CC	Elimination Race	(Mexico) Yareli Acevedo	(Colombia) Elizabeth Castaño	(Canada) Devaney Collier	
2023 Pan American Track Cycling Championships; Argentina 14–18 June 2023 CC	Keirin	(Trinidad and Tobago) Nicholas Paul	(Suriname) Jaïr Tjon En Fa	(Canada) James Hedgcock	
2023 Pan American Track Cycling Championships; Argentina 14–18 June 2023 CC	Keirin	(Colombia) Martha Bayona	(Canada) Lauriane Genest	(Mexico) Luz Gaxiola	
2023 Pan American Track Cycling Championships; Argentina 14–18 June 2023 CC	Omnium	(Canada) Dylan Bibic	(Colombia) Fernando Gaviria	(Trinidad and Tobago) Akil Campbell	
2023 Pan American Track Cycling Championships; Argentina 14–18 June 2023 CC	Omnium	(Mexico) Victoria Velasco	(Trinidad and Tobago) Alexi Ramirez	(Colombia) Lina Rojas	
2023 Pan American Track Cycling Championships; Argentina 14–18 June 2023 CC	Sprint	(Trinidad and Tobago) Nicholas Paul	(Colombia) Kevin Quintero	(Suriname) Jaïr Tjon En Fa	
2023 Pan American Track Cycling Championships; Argentina 14–18 June 2023 CC	Sprint	(Canada) Lauriane Genest	(Mexico) Daniela Gaxiola	(Mexico) Yuli Verdugo	
2023 Pan American Track Cycling Championships; Argentina 14–18 June 2023 CC	Team Sprint	Canada (CAN); James Hedgcock; Tyler Rorke; Nick Wammes	Trinidad and Tobago (TTO); Quincy Alexander; Kwesi Browne; Zion Pulido; Nicholas Paul	Colombia (COL); Cristian Ortega; Rubén Murillo; Kevin Quintero; Juan Ochoa	
2023 Pan American Track Cycling Championships; Argentina 14–18 June 2023 CC	Team Sprint	Mexico (MEX); Jessica Salazar; Yuli Verdugo; Daniela Gaxiola; María Vizcaíno	Canada (CAN); Jackie Boyle; Lauriane Genest; Sarah Orban	United States (USA); Keely Ainslie; Kayla Hankins; Mandy Marquardt; McKenna McKee	
2023 Pan American Track Cycling Championships; Argentina 14–18 June 2023 CC	Team Pursuit	Canada (CAN); Dylan Bibic; Michael Foley; Mathias Guillemette; Sean Richardson	Colombia (COL); Anderson Arboleda; Fernando Gaviria; Juan Arango; Alex Zapata	United States (USA); Anders Johnson; Grant Koontz; Gavin Hoover; David Domonoske	
2023 Pan American Track Cycling Championships; Argentina 14–18 June 2023 CC	Team Pursuit	Canada (CAN); Erin Attwell; Ariane Bonhomme; Fiona Majendie; Ruby West; Devaney Collier	Mexico (MEX); Sofía Arreola; María Gaxiola; Victoria Velasco; Lizbeth Salazar; Yareli Acevedo	United States (USA); Colleen Gulick; Elizabeth Stevenson; Bethany Matsic; Danielle Morshead	
2023 Pan American Track Cycling Championships; Argentina 14–18 June 2023 CC	Individual Pursuit	(Canada) Chris Ernst	(Canada) Michael Foley	(United States) Anders Johnson	
2023 Pan American Track Cycling Championships; Argentina 14–18 June 2023 CC	Individual Pursuit	(Canada) Ariane Bonhomme	(Canada) Fiona Majendie	(Colombia) Andre Alzate	
2023 Pan American Track Cycling Championships; Argentina 14–18 June 2023 CC	Points Race	(Colombia) Juan Arango	(Canada) Mathias Guillemette	(United States) Colby Lange	
2023 Pan American Track Cycling Championships; Argentina 14–18 June 2023 CC	Points Race	(Mexico) Yareli Acevedo	(Colombia) Elizabeth Castaño	(Chile) Paula Villalon	
2023 Pan American Track Cycling Championships; Argentina 14–18 June 2023 CC	Scratch	(Canada) Dylan Bibic	(Mexico) Fernando Nava	(United States) Grant Koontz	
2023 Pan American Track Cycling Championships; Argentina 14–18 June 2023 CC	Scratch	(Mexico) María Gaxiola	(Brazil) Wellyda Rodrigues	(United States) Colleen Gulick	
2023 Pan American Track Cycling Championships; Argentina 14–18 June 2023 CC	Madison	Canada (CAN); Dylan Bibic; Mathias Guillemette	Colombia (COL); Juan Arango; Fernando Gaviria	Mexico (MEX); Ricardo Peña; Fernando Nava	
2023 Pan American Track Cycling Championships; Argentina 14–18 June 2023 CC	Madison	Mexico (MEX); María Gaxiola; Yareli Salazar	Canada (CAN); Ariane Bonhomme; Devaney Collier	Colombia (COL); Lina Rojas; Elizabeth Castaño	
2023 Pan American Track Cycling Championships; Argentina 14–18 June 2023 CC	Time Trial	(Canada) James Hedgcock	(Colombia) Santiago Ramírez	(Mexico) Juan Ruiz	
2023 Pan American Track Cycling Championships; Argentina 14–18 June 2023 CC	Time Trial	(Colombia) Martha Bayona	(United States) Mandy Marquardt	(Mexico) Jessica Salazar	
GP Brno; Czech Republic 17–18 June 2023 CL1
GP Brno; Czech Republic 17–18 June 2023 CL1	Keirin	(United Kingdom) Jack Carlin	(Poland) Patryk Rajkowski	(Greece) Miltiadis Charovas	
GP Brno; Czech Republic 17–18 June 2023 CL1	Keirin	(United Kingdom) Emma Finucane	(United Kingdom) Sophie Capewell	(United Kingdom) Lauren Bell	
GP Brno; Czech Republic 17–18 June 2023 CL1	Omnium	(Belgium) Tuur Dens	(Poland) Filip Prokopyszyn	(Czech Republic) Jan Voneš	
GP Brno; Czech Republic 17–18 June 2023 CL1	Omnium	(Poland) Daria Pikulik	(Poland) Wiktoria Pikulik	(Poland) Oliwia Majewska	
GP Brno; Czech Republic 17–18 June 2023 CL1	Sprint	(Israel) Mikhail Iakovlev	(Poland) Mateusz Rudyk	(United Kingdom) Joseph Truman	
GP Brno; Czech Republic 17–18 June 2023 CL1	Sprint	(United Kingdom) Sophie Capewell	(United Kingdom) Emma Finucane	(United Kingdom) Katy Marchant	
GP Brno; Czech Republic 17–18 June 2023 CL1	Madison	(Belgium) Tuur Dens (Belgium) Jules Hesters	(Czech Republic) Denis Rugovac (Czech Republic) Jan Voneš	(Poland) Piotr Maslak (Poland) Szymon Sajnok	
GP Brno; Czech Republic 17–18 June 2023 CL1	Madison	(Poland) Wiktoria Pikulik (Poland) Daria Pikulik	(Czech Republic) Petra Ševčíková (Czech Republic) Kateřina Kohoutková	(Republic of Ireland) Alice Sharpe (Republic of Ireland) Emily Kay	
T-Town Summer Games: Discover Lehigh Valley Superweek Part II; United States 17–19 June 2023 CL1
T-Town Summer Games: Discover Lehigh Valley Superweek Part II; United States 17–19 June 2023 CL1	Keirin	(Australia) James Brister	(Australia) Byron Davies	(Spain) Alejandro Martínez	
T-Town Summer Games: Discover Lehigh Valley Superweek Part II; United States 17–19 June 2023 CL1	Keirin	(Australia) Alessia McCaig	(Canada) Emy Savard	(United States) Stephanie Lawrence	
T-Town Summer Games: Discover Lehigh Valley Superweek Part II; United States 17–19 June 2023 CL1	Elimination Race	(Australia) Graeme Frislie	(United States) Lance Abshire	(Austria) Maximilian Schmidbauer	
T-Town Summer Games: Discover Lehigh Valley Superweek Part II; United States 17–19 June 2023 CL1	Elimination Race	(United States) Lily Williams	(New Zealand) Emma Cumming	(United States) Kimberly Zubris	
T-Town Summer Games: Discover Lehigh Valley Superweek Part II; United States 17–19 June 2023 CL1	Omnium	(United States) Lance Abshire	(Canada) Cameron Fitzmaurice	(Australia) Graeme Frislie	
T-Town Summer Games: Discover Lehigh Valley Superweek Part II; United States 17–19 June 2023 CL1	Omnium	(United States) Lily Williams	(United States) Kimberly Zubris	(New Zealand) Emma Cumming	
T-Town Summer Games: Discover Lehigh Valley Superweek Part II; United States 17–19 June 2023 CL1	Sprint	(Australia) James Brister	(Australia) Byron Davies	(Australia) Sam Gallagher	
T-Town Summer Games: Discover Lehigh Valley Superweek Part II; United States 17–19 June 2023 CL1	Sprint	(Australia) Alessia McCaig	(Australia) Molly McGill	(Australia) Kalinda Robinson	
T-Town Summer Games: Discover Lehigh Valley Superweek Part II; United States 17–19 June 2023 CL1	Scratch	(Canada) Cameron Fitzmaurice	(United States) Lance Abshire	(United States) Daniel Breuer	
T-Town Summer Games: Discover Lehigh Valley Superweek Part II; United States 17–19 June 2023 CL1	Scratch	(United States) Lily Williams	(New Zealand) Emma Cumming	(Republic of Ireland) Autumn Collins	
T-Town Summer Games: Discover Lehigh Valley Superweek Part II; United States 17–19 June 2023 CL1	Time Trial	(Australia) Byron Davies	(Australia) Maxwell Liebeknecht	(Canada) Ryan-Shaun Macdonald	
T-Town Summer Games: Discover Lehigh Valley Superweek Part II; United States 17–19 June 2023 CL1	Time Trial	(Australia) Molly McGill	(Australia) Alessia McCaig	(Australia) Kalinda Robinson	
T-Town Summer Games: Discover Lehigh Valley Superweek Part II; United States 17–19 June 2023 CL1	Madison	(Austria) Maximilian Schmidbauer (Austria) Tim Wafler	(Australia) Graeme Frislie (Australia) James Moriarty	(United States) Lance Abshire (United States) Daniel Breuer	
T-Town Summer Games: Discover Lehigh Valley Superweek Part II; United States 17–19 June 2023 CL1	Madison	(United States) Kimberly Zubris (United States) Lily Williams	(Republic of Ireland) Autumn Collins (New Zealand) Emma Cumming	(United States) Julianna Rutecki (United States) Jessica Chong	
32. Großer Preis von Deutschland im Sprint- 13. GP Keirin Cottbus; Germany 23–24 June 2023 CL1
32. Großer Preis von Deutschland im Sprint- 13. GP Keirin Cottbus; Germany 23–24 June 2023 CL1	Keirin	(United Kingdom) Hamish Turnbull	(Israel) Mikhail Iakovlev	(Germany) Marc Jurczyk	
32. Großer Preis von Deutschland im Sprint- 13. GP Keirin Cottbus; Germany 23–24 June 2023 CL1	Keirin	(Belgium) Nicky Degrendele	(United Kingdom) Emma Finucane	(United Kingdom) Sophie Capewell	
32. Großer Preis von Deutschland im Sprint- 13. GP Keirin Cottbus; Germany 23–24 June 2023 CL1	Sprint	(United Kingdom) Hamish Turnbull	(Germany) Maximilian Dörnbach	(Germany) Luca Spiegel	
32. Großer Preis von Deutschland im Sprint- 13. GP Keirin Cottbus; Germany 23–24 June 2023 CL1	Sprint	(Germany) Emma Hinze	(Germany) Lea Friedrich	(United Kingdom) Emma Finucane	
32. Großer Preis von Deutschland im Sprint- 13. GP Keirin Cottbus; Germany 23–24 June 2023 CL1	Team Sprint	(France) Oscar Caron (France) Luca Priore (France) Thierry Fontanille	(Germany) Luca Spiegel (Germany) Henric Hackmann (Germany) Paul Groß	(Germany) Paul Schippert (Germany) Julien Jäger (Germany) Kenneth Meng	
32. Großer Preis von Deutschland im Sprint- 13. GP Keirin Cottbus; Germany 23–24 June 2023 CL1	Team Sprint	(United Kingdom) Sophie Capewell (United Kingdom) Katy Marchant (United Kingdom) Emma Finucane	(Belgium) Julie Nicolaes (Belgium) Valerie Jenaer (Belgium) Nicky Degrendele	(Czech Republic) Anna Jaborníková (Czech Republic) Sára Peterková (Czech Republic) Natálie Mikšaníková	
Fiorenzuola International Track Women and Men; Italy 1–6 July 2023 CL1
Fiorenzuola International Track Women and Men; Italy 1–6 July 2023 CL1	Elimination Race	Ivan Smirnov	(Italy) Elia Viviani	(Italy) Francesco Lamon	
Fiorenzuola International Track Women and Men; Italy 1–6 July 2023 CL1	Elimination Race	(Italy) Martina Fidanza	(New Zealand) Bryony Botha	(New Zealand) Michaela Drummond	
Fiorenzuola International Track Women and Men; Italy 1–6 July 2023 CL1	Scratch	(Italy) Francesco Lamon	Viktor Bugaenko	(Switzerland) Simon Vitzthum	
Fiorenzuola International Track Women and Men; Italy 1–6 July 2023 CL1	Scratch	(New Zealand) Michaela Drummond	(Italy) Martina Fidanza	(Germany) Lea Lin Teutenberg	
Fiorenzuola International Track Women and Men; Italy 1–6 July 2023 CL1	Madison	(Italy) Elia Viviani (Italy) Michele Scartezzini	(Australia) Liam Walsh (United States) Peter Moore	Lev Gonov; Ivan Smirnov	
Fiorenzuola International Track Women and Men; Italy 1–6 July 2023 CL1	Madison	(New Zealand) Bryony Botha (New Zealand) Michaela Drummond	(Germany) Lena Charlotte Reißner (Germany) Lea Lin Teutenberg	(Italy) Lara Crestanello (Italy) Sara Fiorin	
Fiorenzuola International Track Women and Men; Italy 1–6 July 2023 CL1	Omnium	(Italy) Francesco Lamon	(Italy) Elia Viviani	Gleb Syritsa	
Fiorenzuola International Track Women and Men; Italy 1–6 July 2023 CL1	Omnium	(Italy) Martina Fidanza	(New Zealand) Emily Shearman	(New Zealand) Michaela Drummond	
Fiorenzuola International Track Women and Men; Italy 1–6 July 2023 CL1	Points Race	(Australia) Liam Walsh	(Italy) Matteo Donegà	(United States) Peter Moore	
Fiorenzuola International Track Women and Men; Italy 1–6 July 2023 CL1	Points Race	(Germany) Lea Lin Teutenberg	(New Zealand) Michaela Drummond	(Italy) Martina Fidanza	
Fiorenzuola International Track Women and Men; Italy 1–6 July 2023 CL1	Sprint	(Germany) Anton Höhne	(Italy) Daniele Napolitano	(Italy) Mattia Predomo	
Fiorenzuola International Track Women and Men; Italy 1–6 July 2023 CL1	Sprint	(Italy) Miriam Vece	(United Kingdom) Milly Tanner	(Italy) Sara Fiorin	
Fiorenzuola International Track Women and Men; Italy 1–6 July 2023 CL1	Time Trial	(Italy) Matteo Bianchi	(Germany) Anton Höhne	(Italy) Stefano Moro	
Fiorenzuola International Track Women and Men; Italy 1–6 July 2023 CL1	Time Trial	(Italy) Miriam Vece	(United Kingdom) Milly Tanner	(France) Lou Dolez	
South London Grand Prix; United Kingdom 20–21 July 2023 CL2
South London Grand Prix; United Kingdom 20–21 July 2023 CL2	Elimination Race	(United Kingdom) William Roberts (United Kingdom) Flora Perkins	(United Kingdom) William Perrett (United Kingdom) Sophie Lewis	(Latvia) George Nemilostivijs (United Kingdom) Maddie Leech	
South London Grand Prix; United Kingdom 20–21 July 2023 CL2	Scratch	(United Kingdom) Rhys Britton (United Kingdom) Dannielle Khan	(United Kingdom) William Perrett (New Zealand) Emma Cumming	(Latvia) George Nemilostivijs (Republic of Ireland) Gabriella Homer	
South London Grand Prix; United Kingdom 20–21 July 2023 CL2	Madison	(United Kingdom) Rhys Britton (United Kingdom) William Perrett (United Kingdom) Maddie Leech (United Kingdom) Sophie Lewis	(United Kingdom) James Ambrose-Parish (Latvia) George Nemilostivijs (New Zealand) Emma Cumming (United Kingdom) Flora Perkins	(United Kingdom) Joe Holt (United Kingdom) Olivier Mangham (United Kingdom) Dannielle Khan (United Kingdom) Lucy Nelson	
South London Grand Prix; United Kingdom 20–21 July 2023 CL2	Omnium	(United Kingdom) Rhys Britton (United Kingdom) Flora Perkins	(United Kingdom) Joe Holt (United Kingdom) Maddie Leech	(United Kingdom) William Perrett (United Kingdom) Dannielle Khan	
South London Grand Prix; United Kingdom 20–21 July 2023 CL2	Sprint	(United Kingdom) Marcus Hiley (United Kingdom) Rhian Edmunds	(United Kingdom) Harvey McNaughton (United Kingdom) Milly Tanner	(United Kingdom) Benjamin Gill (United Kingdom) Lauren Bate	
South London Grand Prix; United Kingdom 20–21 July 2023 CL2	Keirin	(United Kingdom) Harvey McNaughton (United Kingdom) Dannielle Khan	(United Kingdom) Marcus Hiley (United Kingdom) Rhian Edmunds	(United Kingdom) Alec Briggs (United Kingdom) Milly Tanner	
6 Sere Internazionale Città di Pordenone; Italy 17–22 July 2023 CL1
6 Sere Internazionale Città di Pordenone; Italy 17–22 July 2023 CL1	Men's Madison	(Italy) Matteo Donegà (Italy) Davide Boscaro	(Italy) Niccolò Galli (Italy) Lino Colosio	(Czech Republic) Denis Rugovac (Switzerland) Justin Weder	
6 Sere Internazionale Città di Pordenone; Italy 17–22 July 2023 CL1	Men's Omnium	(Italy) Matteo Donegà	(Italy) Davide Boscaro	(Italy) Davide Cimolai	
6 Sere Internazionale Città di Pordenone; Italy 17–22 July 2023 CL1	Points Race	(Italy) Niccolò Galli (Uzbekistan) Nafosat Kozieva	(Italy) Matteo Donegà (Denmark) Amalie Winther Olsen	(Argentina) Iván Gabriel Ruíz (Uzbekistan) Margarita Misyurina	
6 Sere Internazionale Città di Pordenone; Italy 17–22 July 2023 CL1	Men's Scratch	(Slovakia) Martin Chren	(Italy) Matteo Donegà	(France) Hugo Pommelet	
6 Sere Internazionale Città di Pordenone; Italy 17–22 July 2023 CL1	Men's Sprint	(Italy) Stefano Minuta	(Italy) Daniele Napolitano	(Italy) Stefano Moro	
6 Sere Internazionale Città di Pordenone; Italy 17–22 July 2023 CL1	Men's Individual Pursuit	(Italy) Niccolò Galli	(Italy) Lino Colosio	(France) Joffrey Degueurce	
6 Sere Internazionale Città di Pordenone; Italy 17–22 July 2023 CL1	Men's Elimination Race	(Italy) Davide Boscaro	(Italy) Davide Cimolai	(Czech Republic) Denis Rugovac	
Taça Brasil de Pista - Etapa Internacional - Parte I Brazil 25–27 July 2023 CL2
Taça Brasil de Pista - Etapa Internacional - Parte I Brazil 25–27 July 2023 CL2	Elimination Race	(Colombia) Miguel Hoyos (Brazil) Alice Melo	(Argentina) Lucas Gaday (Argentina) Maribel Aguirre	(Colombia) Julián Osorio (Brazil) Nicolle Borges	
Taça Brasil de Pista - Etapa Internacional - Parte I Brazil 25–27 July 2023 CL2	Keirin	(Colombia) Fabián Puerta (Argentina) Valentina Luna	(Argentina) Lucas Vilar (Colombia) Juliana Gaviria	(Colombia) Juan Ochoa (Chile) Paula Molina	
Taça Brasil de Pista - Etapa Internacional - Parte I Brazil 25–27 July 2023 CL2	Sprint	(Argentina) Lucas Vilar (Argentina) Valentina Luna	(Colombia) Rubén Murillo (Colombia) Juliana Gaviria	(Argentina) Juan Bautista Rodríguez (Brazil) Carolina Barbosa	
Taça Brasil de Pista - Etapa Internacional - Parte I Brazil 25–27 July 2023 CL2	Omnium	(Brazil) Armando Camargo Filho (Brazil) Alice Melo	(Argentina) Marcos Méndez (Argentina) Maribel Aguirre	(Argentina) Rubén Ramos (Argentina) Cristina Irma Greve	
Taça Brasil de Pista - Etapa Internacional - Parte I Brazil 25–27 July 2023 CL2	Madison	(Brazil) Armando Camargo Filho (Brazil) Luan Carlos Rodrigues Silva (Brazil) Nicolle Borges (Brazil) Alice Melo	(Colombia) Julián Osorio (Colombia) Camilo Sepúlveda (Argentina) Cristina Irma Greve (Argentina) Maribel Aguirre	(Ecuador) Cristian Gutiérrez Pianda (Argentina) Rubén Ramos (Uruguay) Luciana Wynants (Uruguay) Paola Wynants	
Taça Brasil de Pista - Etapa Internacional - Parte II; Brazil 28–30 July 2023 CL2
Taça Brasil de Pista - Etapa Internacional - Parte II; Brazil 28–30 July 2023 CL2	Scratch	(Argentina) Marcos Méndez (Brazil) Dayana Aguilar Garcia	(Argentina) Rubén Ramos (Uruguay) Paola Wynants	(Colombia) Camilo Sepúlveda (Brazil) Amanda Kunkel	
Taça Brasil de Pista - Etapa Internacional - Parte II; Brazil 28–30 July 2023 CL2	Keirin	(Colombia) Fabián Puerta (Argentina) Valentina Luna	(Brazil) João Vitor da Silva (Colombia) Juliana Gaviria	(Argentina) Lucas Vilar (Chile) Paula Molina	
Taça Brasil de Pista - Etapa Internacional - Parte II; Brazil 28–30 July 2023 CL2	Sprint	(Argentina) Lucas Vilar (Argentina) Valentina Luna	(Colombia) Juan Ochoa (Colombia) Juliana Gaviria	(Colombia) Rubén Murillo (Colombia) Yarli Mosquera	
Taça Brasil de Pista - Etapa Internacional - Parte II; Brazil 28–30 July 2023 CL2	Omnium	(Argentina) Marcos Méndez (Brazil) Alice Melo	(Chile) Diego Ferreyra (Brazil) Nicolle Borges	(Brazil) Samuel Hauane Reikdal Stachera (Argentina) Maribel Aguirre	
Taça Brasil de Pista - Etapa Internacional - Parte II; Brazil 28–30 July 2023 CL2	Madison	(Colombia) Julián Osorio (Argentina) Marcos Méndez (Brazil) Alice Melo (Brazil) Nicolle Borges	(Brazil) Fábio Dalamaria (Brazil) Samuel Hauane Reikdal Stachera (Argentina) Maribel Aguirre (Argentina) Cristina Irma Greve	(Brazil) Otávio Augusto Gonzeli (Brazil) Cristian Egídio (Uruguay) Luciana Wynants (Uruguay) Paola Wynants	
Taiwan Cup Track International Classic I Chinese Taipei 13–14 August 2023 CL1
Taiwan Cup Track International Classic I Chinese Taipei 13–14 August 2023 CL1	Keirin	(Chinese Taipei) Kang Shih-feng (Chinese Taipei) Wang Tzu-chun	(Chinese Taipei) Shih Hsin Hsiao (Chinese Taipei) Chen Ching-yun	(Indonesia) Terry Yudha Kusuma (India) Shushikala Agashe	
Taiwan Cup Track International Classic I Chinese Taipei 13–14 August 2023 CL1	Men's Madison	(Indonesia) Bernard Van Aert (Indonesia) Terry Yudha Kusuma	(Chinese Taipei) Chang Chih-sheng (Chinese Taipei) Shi Ru Xu	(Hong Kong) Kai Kwong Tso (Hong Kong) King Hung Liang	
Taiwan Cup Track International Classic I Chinese Taipei 13–14 August 2023 CL1	Team Sprint	(Chinese Taipei) Yang Sheng-kai (Chinese Taipei) Shih Hsin Hsiao (Chinese Taipei) Kang Shih-feng (Chinese Taipei) Hsiao Mei-yu (Chinese Taipei) Chen Ching-yun (Chinese Taipei) Wang Tzu-chun	(Chinese Taipei) Chen Chien-liang (Chinese Taipei) Huang Ching-lun (Chinese Taipei) Tsai Chia-hsun (India) Shushikala Agashe (India) Triyasha Paul (India) Mayuri Lute	(Chinese Taipei) Lee Chun-yen (Chinese Taipei) Lee Wei-chen (Chinese Taipei) Tseng Chia-chieh	
Taiwan Cup Track International Classic I Chinese Taipei 13–14 August 2023 CL1	Sprint	(Chinese Taipei) Kang Shih-feng (India) Mayuri Lute	(Chinese Taipei) Yang Sheng-kai (India) Triyasha Paul	(Chinese Taipei) Tsai Chia-hsun (Chinese Taipei) Wang Tzu-chun	
Taiwan Cup Track International Classic I Chinese Taipei 13–14 August 2023 CL1	Omnium	(Indonesia) Bernard Van Aert (Chinese Taipei) Huang Ting-ying	(Indonesia) Yosandy Oetomo (Chinese Taipei) Szeng Ke-xin	(Indonesia) Terry Yudha Kusuma (Chinese Taipei) Lei Ying-hsiu	
Taiwan Cup Track International Classic II; Chinese Taipei 15 August 2023 CL2
Taiwan Cup Track International Classic II; Chinese Taipei 15 August 2023 CL2	Keirin	(Chinese Taipei) Kang Shih-feng (India) Mayuri Lute	(Chinese Taipei) Shih Hsin Hsiao (Malaysia) Ann Yii Yong	(Chinese Taipei) Huang Ching-lun (Chinese Taipei) Wang Tzu-chun	
Taiwan Cup Track International Classic II; Chinese Taipei 15 August 2023 CL2	Men's Madison	(Indonesia) Bernard Van Aert (Indonesia) Terry Yudha Kusuma	(Indonesia) Yosandy Oetomo (Indonesia) Dealton Prayogo	(Hong Kong) Kai Kwong Tso (Hong Kong) King Hung Liang	
Taiwan Cup Track International Classic II; Chinese Taipei 15 August 2023 CL2	Scratch	(Indonesia) Terry Yudha Kusuma (Chinese Taipei) Lei Ying-hsiu	(Indonesia) Yosandy Oetomo (India) Shushikala Agashe	(Malaysia) Hung Chiat Fong (Indonesia) Dewika Mulya Sova	
Taiwan Cup Track International Classic II; Chinese Taipei 15 August 2023 CL2	Sprint	(Chinese Taipei) Kang Shih-feng (Chinese Taipei) Wang Tzu-chun	(Chinese Taipei) Yang Sheng-kai (India) Triyasha Paul	(Chinese Taipei) Tsai Chia-hsun (Chinese Taipei) Chen Ching-yun	
GP TUFO-VC Olomouckého kraje Czech Republic 17 August 2023 CL2
GP TUFO-VC Olomouckého kraje Czech Republic 17 August 2023 CL2	Elimination Race	(Czech Republic) Matyáš Koblížek (Czech Republic) Kateřina Kohoutková	(Czech Republic) Radovan Štec (Slovakia) Alžbeta Bačíková	(Czech Republic) Štěpán Široký (Czech Republic) Gabriela Bártová	
GP TUFO-VC Olomouckého kraje Czech Republic 17 August 2023 CL2	Men's Madison	(Poland) Konrad Waliniak (Poland) Kacper Majewski	(Czech Republic) Adam Křenek (Czech Republic) Radovan Štec	(Poland) Wojciech Pszczolarski (Poland) Filip Prokopyszyn	
GP TUFO-VC Olomouckého kraje Czech Republic 17 August 2023 CL2	Points Race	(Czech Republic) Matyáš Koblížek (Czech Republic) Jarmila Machačová	(Czech Republic) Adam Křenek (Czech Republic) Kateřina Kohoutková	(Poland) Filip Prokopyszyn (Czech Republic) Barbora Němcová	
Korea Track Cup; South Korea 17–20 August 2023 CL2
Korea Track Cup; South Korea 17–20 August 2023 CL2	Sprint	(South Korea) Kim Dong-hyun (South Korea) Kim Ha-eun	(South Korea) Kim Cheng-su (South Korea) Hwang Hyeon-seo	(South Korea) Bae Jun-hyeong (South Korea) Park Ji-hae	
Korea Track Cup; South Korea 17–20 August 2023 CL2	Keirin				
Korea Track Cup; South Korea 17–20 August 2023 CL2	Omnium				
Korea Track Cup; South Korea 17–20 August 2023 CL2	Madison	(South Korea) Joo Sarang (South Korea) Jun Jee-hwan (South Korea) Na Ah-reum (South Korea) Song Min-ji	(South Korea) Kang Suk-ho (South Korea) Hong Seung-min (South Korea) Kim Hyun-ji (South Korea) Kim You-ri	(South Korea) Jeong Jae-hun (South Korea) Kim Eun-min (Chinese Taipei) Huang Ting-ying (Chinese Taipei) Zeng Ke-xin	
GP Prostějov-Memoriál Otmara Malečka; Czech Republic 18–19 August 2023 CL2
GP Prostějov-Memoriál Otmara Malečka; Czech Republic 18–19 August 2023 CL2	Elimination Race	(Czech Republic) Štěpán Široký (Czech Republic) Barbora Němcová	(Poland) Kacper Majewski (Slovakia) Alžbeta Bačíková	(Czech Republic) Richard Kobr (Denmark) Amalie Winther Olsen	
GP Prostějov-Memoriál Otmara Malečka; Czech Republic 18–19 August 2023 CL2	Keirin				
GP Prostějov-Memoriál Otmara Malečka; Czech Republic 18–19 August 2023 CL2	Omnium	(Poland) Konrad Waliniak (Czech Republic) Gabriela Bártová	(Czech Republic) Matyáš Koblížek (Czech Republic) Barbora Němcová	(Poland) Filip Prokopyszyn (Czech Republic) Jarmila Machačová	
GP Prostějov-Memoriál Otmara Malečka; Czech Republic 18–19 August 2023 CL2	Scratch	(Czech Republic) Matyáš Koblížek (Czech Republic) Jarmila Machačová	(Poland) Filip Prokopyszyn (Slovakia) Alžbeta Bačíková	(Czech Republic) Adam Křenek (Czech Republic) Barbora Němcová	
GP Prostějov-Memoriál Otmara Malečka; Czech Republic 18–19 August 2023 CL2	Madison	(Poland) Kacper Majewski (Poland) Adam Woźniak (Czech Republic) Barbora Němcová (Czech Republic) Gabriela Bártová	(Czech Republic) Radovan Štec (Poland) Konrad Waliniak (Czech Republic) Kateřina Kohoutková (Czech Republic) Jarmila Machačová	(Poland) Wojciech Pszczolarski (Czech Republic) Matyáš Koblížek (Denmark) Amalie Winther Olsen (Italy) Francesca Selva	
Internationales Meeting Für Sprint u. Omnium; Germany 24–25 August 2023 CL1
Internationales Meeting Für Sprint u. Omnium; Germany 24–25 August 2023 CL1	Men's Elimination Race	(Germany) Moritz Augenstein	(Netherlands) Philip Heijnen	(Germany) Moritz Malcharek	
Internationales Meeting Für Sprint u. Omnium; Germany 24–25 August 2023 CL1	Men's Keirin	(Germany) Luca Spiegel	(Germany) Julien Jäger	(Germany) Anton Höhne	
Internationales Meeting Für Sprint u. Omnium; Germany 24–25 August 2023 CL1	Men's Omnium	(Germany) Moritz Augenstein	(Netherlands) Philip Heijnen	(Germany) Jasper Schröder	
Internationales Meeting Für Sprint u. Omnium; Germany 24–25 August 2023 CL1	Scratch	(Germany) Jasper Schröder	(Germany) Martin Salmon	(Netherlands) Roy Eefting	
Internationales Meeting Für Sprint u. Omnium; Germany 24–25 August 2023 CL1	Sprint	(Germany) Anton Höhne (Germany) Alessa-Catriona Pröpster	(Germany) Luca Spiegel (Germany) Clara Schneider	(Germany) Willy Weinrich (Germany) Lara-Sophie Jäger	
Track Asia Cup 2023; Thailand 26–30 August 2023 CL1
Track Asia Cup 2023; Thailand 26–30 August 2023 CL1	Individual Pursuit	(South Korea) Hong Seung-min (India) Meenakshi Rohilla	(Hong Kong) Ng Sum Lui (Saudi Arabia) Daniah Sembawa	(India) Vishavjeet Singh (Saudi Arabia) Monirah Aldraiweesh	
Track Asia Cup 2023; Thailand 26–30 August 2023 CL1	Elimination Race	(South Korea) Kang Suk-ho (India) Himanshi Singh	(South Korea) Hong Ji-won (Saudi Arabia) Daniah Sembawa	(Hong Kong) King Hung Liang (Saudi Arabia) Muruj Felemban	
Track Asia Cup 2023; Thailand 26–30 August 2023 CL1	Team Sprint	Indonesia (INA); Dika Alif Dhentaka; Mochamad Bintang Syawal; Fandi Jolata; South Korea (KOR); Kim Chae-yeon; Park Ha-young; Jang Eun-seol	Thailand (THA); Pongthep Tapimay; Wachirawit Saenkhamwong; Petcharat Yeaunyong; Thailand (THA); Natthaporn Aphimot; Yaowaret Jitmat; Pannaray Rasee	South Korea (KOR); Kim Dong-hyun; Kim Geun-woo; Ha Jun-hong; Saudi Arabia (KSA); Daniah Sembawa; Muruj Felemban; Monirah Aldraiweesh	
Track Asia Cup 2023; Thailand 26–30 August 2023 CL1	Keirin	(South Korea) Kim Dong-hyun (South Korea) Park Ha-young	(Malaysia) Ahmad Safwan Ahmad Nazeri (Thailand) Yaowaret Jitmat	(South Korea) Ha Jun-hong (Indonesia) Wiji Lestari	
Track Asia Cup 2023; Thailand 26–30 August 2023 CL1	Time Trial	(Indonesia) Dika Alif Dhentaka (Indonesia) Wiji Lestari	(South Korea) Hong Seung-min (South Korea) Kim Chae-yeon	(South Korea) Kim Geun-woo (Indonesia) Ratu Afifah Nur Indah	
Track Asia Cup 2023; Thailand 26–30 August 2023 CL1	Scratch	(India) Dinesh Kumar (India) Meenakshi Rohilla	(Thailand) Thak Kaeonoi (India) Himanshi Singh	(Hong Kong) Kai Kwong Tso (Saudi Arabia) Daniah Sembawa	
Track Asia Cup 2023; Thailand 26–30 August 2023 CL1	Team Pursuit	South Korea (KOR); Kang Suk-ho; Kim Ung-gyeom; Hong Seung-min; Hong Ji-won	India (IND); Vishavjeet Singh; Dinesh Kumar; Dinesh Kumar; Manjeet Kumar	Hong Kong (HKG); Joseph Lau; King Hung Liang; Sum Lui Ng; Kai Kwong Tso	
Track Asia Cup 2023; Thailand 26–30 August 2023 CL1	Points Race	(Hong Kong) Kai Kwong Tso (India) Meenakshi Rohilla	(India) Harshveer Sekhon (India) Himanshi Singh	(South Korea) Hong Ji-won (Saudi Arabia) Daniah Sembawa	
Track Asia Cup 2023; Thailand 26–30 August 2023 CL1	Sprint	(Hong Kong) Kim Dong-hyun (South Korea) Kim Chae-yeon	(Thailand) Wachirawit Saenkhamwong (Indonesia) Ratu Afifah Nur Indah	(South Korea) Kim Geun-woo (Indonesia) Wiji Lestari	
Coupe de France FENIOUX Piste; France 8–10 September 2023 CL2
Coupe de France FENIOUX Piste; France 8–10 September 2023 CL2	Keirin	(France) Etienne Oliviero (France) Julie Michaux	(France) Florian Grengbo (France) Constance Marchand	(France) Tom Derache (France) Marie Louisa Drouode	
Coupe de France FENIOUX Piste; France 8–10 September 2023 CL2	Madison	(Switzerland) Nicolò De Lisi (Switzerland) Simon Vitzthum (Switzerland) Cybèle Schneider (Switzerland) Aline Seitz	(France) Cédric Monge (France) Maxence Colombe (France) Léane Tabu (France) Constance Marchand	(France) Dorian Carreau (France) Jonathan Lebreton (France) Violette Demay (France) Léonie Mahieu	
Coupe de France FENIOUX Piste; France 8–10 September 2023 CL2	Sprint	(France) Tom Derache (France) Marie Louisa Drouode	(France) Timmy Gillion (France) Julie Michaux	(France) Noé Colsy (Spain) Helena Casas	
Coupe de France FENIOUX Piste; France 8–10 September 2023 CL2	Omnium	(Switzerland) Nicolò De Lisi (France) Constance Marchand	(Switzerland) Simon Vitzthum (Switzerland) Cybèle Schneider	(Switzerland) Raphael Clemencio (Netherlands) Maaike Brandwagt	
Coupe de France FENIOUX Piste; France 8–10 September 2023 CL2	Points Race	(France) Dorian Carreau (Switzerland) Cybèle Schneider	(Switzerland) Raphael Clemencio (France) Lara Lallemant	(France) Gabriel Coulondre (France) Constance Marchand	
GP Budapest; Hungary 9–10 September 2023 CL2
GP Budapest; Hungary 9–10 September 2023 CL2	Elimination Race	(Colombia) Jordan Parra (Norway) Anita Stenberg	(Austria) Tim Wafler (Colombia) Lina Rojas	(Argentina) Facundo Lezica (Slovakia) Alžbeta Bačíková	
GP Budapest; Hungary 9–10 September 2023 CL2	Men's Keirin	(Colombia) Cristian Ortega	(Hungary) Patrik Rómeó Lovassy	(Czech Republic) Dominik Topinka	
GP Budapest; Hungary 9–10 September 2023 CL2	Scratch	(Colombia) Jordan Parra (Norway) Anita Stenberg	(Argentina) Facundo Lezica (Colombia) Lina Hernández	(Hungary) Viktor Filutás (Slovakia) Alžbeta Bačíková	
GP Budapest; Hungary 9–10 September 2023 CL2	Men's Sprint	(Colombia) Cristian Ortega	(Hungary) Patrik Rómeó Lovassy	(Czech Republic) Dominik Topinka	
GP Budapest; Hungary 9–10 September 2023 CL2	Omnium	(Argentina) Facundo Lezica (Norway) Anita Stenberg	(Argentina) Iván Ruiz (Colombia) Lina Hernández	(Hungary) Bertold Drijver (Colombia) Lina Rojas	
GP Budapest; Hungary 9–10 September 2023 CL2	Points Race	(United Kingdom) Rhys Britton (Norway) Anita Stenberg	(Hungary) Bertold Drijver (Colombia) Lina Hernández	(Argentina) Iván Ruiz (Colombia) Lina Rojas	
19è Trofeu Internacional Ciutat de Barcelona X Memorial M. Poblet; Spain 15–17 September 2023 CL2
19è Trofeu Internacional Ciutat de Barcelona X Memorial M. Poblet; Spain 15–17 September 2023 CL2	Keirin	(Colombia) Cristian Ortega (Germany) Clara Schneider	(Colombia) Fabián Puerta (United Kingdom) Rhian Edmunds	(United Kingdom) Niall Monks (Spain) Helena Casas	
19è Trofeu Internacional Ciutat de Barcelona X Memorial M. Poblet; Spain 15–17 September 2023 CL2	Madison	(Switzerland) Valère Thiébaut (Switzerland) Alex Vogel (Switzerland) Cybèle Schneider (Switzerland) Léna Mettraux	(Colombia) Juan Arango (Colombia) Jordan Parra (Italy) Silvia Zanardi (Poland) Karolina Karasiewicz	(Argentina) Facundo Lezica (Argentina) Iván Ruiz (Colombia) Lina Hernández (Colombia) Lina Rojas	
19è Trofeu Internacional Ciutat de Barcelona X Memorial M. Poblet; Spain 15–17 September 2023 CL2	Omnium	(Sweden) Gustav Johansson (Norway) Anita Stenberg	(Switzerland) Valère Thiébaut (Italy) Silvia Zanardi	(Colombia) Juan Arango (Spain) Eukene Larrarte	
19è Trofeu Internacional Ciutat de Barcelona X Memorial M. Poblet; Spain 15–17 September 2023 CL2	Sprint	(Colombia) Cristian Ortega (Germany) Clara Schneider	(United Kingdom) Harry Ledingham-Horn (United Kingdom) Rhian Edmunds	(Colombia) Fabián Puerta (United Kingdom) Milly Tanner	
Grand Prix Favorit Brno - Přilba Moravy; Czech Republic 21–22 September 2023 CL1
Grand Prix Favorit Brno - Přilba Moravy; Czech Republic 21–22 September 2023 CL1	Madison	(Italy) Davide Boscaro (Italy) Samuel Quaranta (Italy) Martina Alzini (Italy) Sara Fiorin	(Denmark) Noah Wulff (Denmark) Conrad Haugsted (Czech Republic) Kateřina Kohoutková (Czech Republic) Petra Ševčíková	(Poland) Filip Prokopyszyn (Poland) Wojciech Pszczolarski (Colombia) Lina Hernández (Colombia) Lina Rojas	
Grand Prix Favorit Brno - Přilba Moravy; Czech Republic 21–22 September 2023 CL1	Omnium	(Italy) Davide Boscaro (Italy) Martina Alzini	(Germany) Jasper Schröder (Czech Republic) Petra Ševčíková	(Italy) Matteo Donegà (Colombia) Lina Hernández	
2022 Asian Games; China 26–29 September 2023 JR
2022 Asian Games; China 26–29 September 2023 JR	Team Sprint	Japan (JPN); Kaiya Ota; Yuta Obara; Yoshitaku Nagasako; China (CHN); Bao Shanju; Guo Yufang; Jiang Yulu; Yuan Liying	China (CHN); Yu Zhou; Chenxi Xue; Qi Liu; Guo Shuai; South Korea (KOR); Lee Hye-jin; Cho Sun-young; Kim Ha-eun; Hwang Hyeon-seo	Malaysia (MAS); Umar Hasbullah; Fadhil Zonis; Ridwan Sahrom; Malaysia (MAS); Nurul Aliana Syafika Azizan; Nurul Izzah Izzati Mohd Asri; Anis Amira Rosid	
2022 Asian Games; China 26–29 September 2023 JR	Keirin	(China) Zhou Yu (Japan) Mina Sato	(South Korea) Kang Seo-jun (China) Wang Lijuan	(Malaysia) Muhammad Shah Firdaus Sahrom (China) Zhang Linyin	
2022 Asian Games; China 26–29 September 2023 JR	Team Pursuit	Japan (JPN); Eiya Hashimoto; Naoki Kojima; Kazushige Kuboki; Shoi Matsuda; Shunsuke Imamura; Japan (JPN); Mizuki Ikeda; Yumi Kajihara; Maho Kakita; Tsuyaka Uchino	China (CHN); Sun Haijiao; Sun Wentao; Yang Yang; Zhang Haiao; China (CHN); Wang Susu; Wang Xiaoyue; Wei Suwan; Zhang Hongjie	South Korea (KOR); Jang Hun; Kim Hyeon-seok; Min Kyeong-ho; Shin Dong-in; Hong Kong (HKG); Lee Sze Wing; Leung Bo Yee; Leung Wing Yee; Yang Qianyu	
2022 Asian Games; China 26–29 September 2023 JR	Madison	Japan (JPN); Naoki Kojima; Shunsuke Imamura; Japan (JPN); Maho Kakita; Tsuyaka Uchino	South Korea (KOR); Shin Dong-in; Kim Eu-ro; Hong Kong (HKG); Lee Sze Wing; Yang Qianyu	Kazakhstan (KAZ); Artyom Zakharov; Ramis Dinmukhametov; South Korea (KOR); Lee Ju-mi; Na Ah-reum	
2022 Asian Games; China 26–29 September 2023 JR	Omnium	(Japan) Kazushige Kuboki (Japan) Yumi Kajihara	(Hong Kong) Leung Ka Yu (Hong Kong) Lee Sze Wing	(United Arab Emirates) Ahmed Al-Mansoori (China) Liu Jiali	
2022 Asian Games; China 26–29 September 2023 JR	Sprint	(Japan) Kaiya Ota (Japan) Mina Sato	(China) Zhou Yu (China) Yuan Liying	(Malaysia) Muhammad Shah Firdaus Sahrom (Japan) Riyu Ohta	
3 Jours d'Aigle; Switzerland 28–30 September 2023 CL1
3 Jours d'Aigle; Switzerland 28–30 September 2023 CL1	Points Race	(France) Oscar Nilsson-Julien (France) Victoire Berteau	(United States) Colby Lange (France) Valentine Fortin	(Switzerland) Simon Vitzthum (Denmark) Amalie Dideriksen	
3 Jours d'Aigle; Switzerland 28–30 September 2023 CL1	Madison	(France) Valentin Tabellion (France) Oscar Nilsson-Julien (France) Victoire Berteau (France) Valentine Fortin	(France) Clément Petit (Belgium) Jules Hesters (France) Marie Le Net (France) Marion Borras	(Belgium) Tuur Dens (Belgium) Noah Vandenbranden (Denmark) Amalie Dideriksen (Denmark) Ellen Klinge	
3 Jours d'Aigle; Switzerland 28–30 September 2023 CL1	Omnium	(France) Oscar Nilsson-Julien (France) Valentine Fortin	(France) Clément Petit (France) Victoire Berteau	(Switzerland) Simon Vitzthum (Czech Republic) Petra Ševčíková	
3 Jours d'Aigle; Switzerland 28–30 September 2023 CL1	Scratch	(Denmark) Tobias Hansen (France) Marion Borras	(France) Clément Petit (Denmark) Amalie Dideriksen	(United States) Colby Lange (France) Marie Le Net	
3 Jours d'Aigle; Switzerland 28–30 September 2023 CL1	Individual Pursuit	(Belgium) Noah Vandenbranden (France) Marion Borras	(Switzerland) Simon Vitzthum (Denmark) Alberte Greve	(Belgium) Tuur Dens (Belgium) Marith Vanhove	
3 Jours d'Aigle; Switzerland 28–30 September 2023 CL1	Elimination Race	(Denmark) Tobias Hansen (France) Valentine Fortin	(Switzerland) Claudio Imhof (Czech Republic) Petra Ševčíková	(France) Valentin Tabellion (France) Victoire Berteau	
Life's an Omnium; Switzerland 5 October 2023 CL2
Life's an Omnium; Switzerland 5 October 2023 CL2	Men's Scratch	(Italy) Francesco Lamon	(Italy) Juan David Sierra	(Italy) Davide Boscaro	
Life's an Omnium; Switzerland 5 October 2023 CL2	Men's Madison	(Italy) Juan David Sierra (Italy) Matteo Donegà	(Italy) Davide Boscaro (Italy) Francesco Lamon	(Switzerland) Claudio Imhof (Switzerland) Simon Vitzthum	
Life's an Omnium; Switzerland 5 October 2023 CL2	Men's Elimination Race	(Italy) Francesco Lamon	(Switzerland) Claudio Imhof	(Italy) Davide Boscaro	
Life's an Omnium; Switzerland 5 October 2023 CL2	Women's Omnium	(Italy) Silvia Zanardi	(Switzerland) Cybèle Schneider	(Switzerland) Aline Seitz	
GP Norway; Norway 14–15 October 2023 CL2
GP Norway; Norway 14–15 October 2023 CL2	Omnium	(Norway) Karsten Feldmann (Norway) Nora Tveit	(Norway) Sondre Weiseth	(Denmark) Conrad Haugsted	
GP Norway; Norway 14–15 October 2023 CL2	Scratch	(Sweden) Gustav Johansson (Norway) Nora Tveit	(Norway) Karsten Feldmann	(Denmark) Conrad Haugsted	
GP Norway; Norway 14–15 October 2023 CL2	Points Race	(Norway) Halvor Utengen Sandstad (Norway) Nora Tveit	(Norway) Karsten Feldmann	(Norway) Sondre Weiseth	
2023 UCI Track Champions League - Round 1 Spain 21 October 2023 TCL
2023 UCI Track Champions League - Round 1 Spain 21 October 2023 TCL	Keirin	(Netherlands) Harrie Lavreysen (New Zealand) Ellesse Andrews	(Colombia) Kevin Quintero (Colombia) Martha Bayona	(Australia) Matthew Richardson (Germany) Alessa-Catriona Pröpster	
2023 UCI Track Champions League - Round 1 Spain 21 October 2023 TCL	Sprint	(Netherlands) Harrie Lavreysen (Germany) Alessa-Catriona Pröpster	(France) Tom Derache (United Kingdom) Emma Finucane	(Poland) Mateusz Rudyk (Colombia) Martha Bayona	
2023 UCI Track Champions League - Round 1 Spain 21 October 2023 TCL	Elimination Race	(Canada) Dylan Bibic (United Kingdom) Katie Archibald	(United Kingdom) William Tidball (Norway) Anita Stenberg	(Belgium) Jules Hesters (United States) Lily Williams	
2023 UCI Track Champions League - Round 1 Spain 21 October 2023 TCL	Scratch	(Japan) Eiya Hashimoto (United States) Lily Williams	(United Kingdom) Mark Stewart (United Kingdom) Katie Archibald	(Belgium) Tuur Dens (Canada) Maggie Coles-Lyster	
TCL Points Race - Mallorca; Spain 21 October 2023 CL2
TCL Points Race - Mallorca; Spain 21 October 2023 CL2	Points Race	(Spain) Sebastián Mora (Norway) Anita Stenberg	(United Kingdom) William Perrett (United Kingdom) Katie Archibald	(United States) Gavin Hoover (Republic of Ireland) Lara Gillespie	
Cycling at the 2023 Pan American Games; Chile 24–27 October 2023 JR
Cycling at the 2023 Pan American Games; Chile 24–27 October 2023 JR	Keirin	(Colombia) Kevin Quintero (Colombia) Martha Bayona	(Trinidad and Tobago) Nicholas Paul (Mexico) Daniela Gaxiola	(Mexico) Juan Ruiz Terán (Jamaica) Dahlia Palmer	
Cycling at the 2023 Pan American Games; Chile 24–27 October 2023 JR	Sprint	(Trinidad and Tobago) Nicholas Paul (Colombia) Martha Bayona	(Suriname) Jaïr Tjon En Fa (Mexico) Yuli Verdugo	(Colombia) Kevin Quintero (United States) Mandy Marquardt	
Cycling at the 2023 Pan American Games; Chile 24–27 October 2023 JR	Omnium	(Peru) Hugo Ruiz (Mexico) Yareli Acevedo	(Mexico) Ricardo Peña (Colombia) Lina Hernández	(Chile) Jacob Decar (Chile) Catalina Soto	
Cycling at the 2023 Pan American Games; Chile 24–27 October 2023 JR	Madison	Mexico (MEX); Fernando Nava; Ricardo Peña; Colombia (COL); Lina Rojas; Lina Hernández	Colombia (COL); Jordan Parra; Juan Arango; Mexico (MEX); Lizbeth Salazar; María Gaxiola	United States (USA); Colby Lange; Grant Koontz; United States (USA); Chloe Patrick; Colleen Gulick	
Cycling at the 2023 Pan American Games; Chile 24–27 October 2023 JR	Team Sprint	Canada (CAN); Tyler Rorke; Nick Wammes; James Hedgcock; Mexico (MEX); Jessica Salazar; Yuli Verdugo; Daniela Gaxiola	Colombia (COL); Carlos Daniel Echeverri; Rubén Murillo; Kevin Quintero; United States (USA); Keely Ainslie; Kayla Hankins; Mandy Marquardt	Mexico (MEX); Jafet Emmanuel López; Juan Ruiz Terán; Edgar Verdugo; Canada (CAN); Emy Savard; Sarah Orban; Jackie Boyle	
Cycling at the 2023 Pan American Games; Chile 24–27 October 2023 JR	Team Pursuit	Canada (CAN); Carson Mattern; Campbell Parrish; Michael Foley; Sean Richardson; Canada (CAN); Devaney Collier; Fiona Majendie; Kiara Lylyk; Ruby West	Colombia (COL); Brayan Sánchez; Jordan Parra; Juan Arango; Nelson Soto; Mexico (MEX); Lizbeth Salazar; María Gaxiola; Victoria Velasco; Yareli Acevedo	United States (USA); Brendan Rhim; Colby Lange; David Domonoske; Grant Koontz; Colombia (COL); Andrea Alzate; Juliana Londoño; Lina Rojas; Lina Hernández	
2023 UCI Track Champions League - Round 2 Germany 28 October 2023 TCL
2023 UCI Track Champions League - Round 2 Germany 28 October 2023 TCL	Keirin	(Netherlands) Harrie Lavreysen (New Zealand) Ellesse Andrews	(Australia) Matthew Richardson (Germany) Alessa-Catriona Pröpster	(France) Tom Derache (United Kingdom) Lowri Thomas	
2023 UCI Track Champions League - Round 2 Germany 28 October 2023 TCL	Sprint	(Netherlands) Harrie Lavreysen (New Zealand) Ellesse Andrews	(Poland) Mateusz Rudyk (United Kingdom) Katy Marchant	(Australia) Matthew Richardson (United Kingdom) Emma Finucane	
2023 UCI Track Champions League - Round 2 Germany 28 October 2023 TCL	Elimination Race	(Belgium) Jules Hesters (United Kingdom) Katie Archibald	(Japan) Eiya Hashimoto (Canada) Maggie Coles-Lyster	(United Kingdom) William Tidball (Norway) Anita Stenberg	
2023 UCI Track Champions League - Round 2 Germany 28 October 2023 TCL	Scratch	(Canada) Dylan Bibic (United States) Lily Williams	(Austria) Maximilian Schmidbauer (Canada) Sarah Van Dam	(Denmark) Tobias Hansen (Norway) Anita Stenberg	
TCL Points Race - Berlin; Germany 28 October 2023 CL2
TCL Points Race - Berlin; Germany 28 October 2023 CL2	Points Race	(Belgium) Tuur Dens (United Kingdom) Katie Archibald	(Belgium) Jules Hesters (United States) Lily Williams	(Switzerland) Claudio Imhof (United Kingdom) Sophie Lewis	
Welsh Cycling & Newport Live Celebration Track Event; United Kingdom 3–4 November 2023 CL2
Welsh Cycling & Newport Live Celebration Track Event; United Kingdom 3–4 November 2023 CL2	Elimination Race	(United Kingdom) Matthew Brennan (United Kingdom) Anna Morris	(United Kingdom) Jed Smithson (United Kingdom) Megan Barker	(Sweden) Gustav Johansson (United Kingdom) Jessica Roberts	
Welsh Cycling & Newport Live Celebration Track Event; United Kingdom 3–4 November 2023 CL2	Keirin	(United Kingdom) Lyall Craig (Germany) Emma Hinze	(United Kingdom) William Munday (United Kingdom) Rhian Edmunds	(United Kingdom) Benjamin Gill (Spain) Helena Casas	
Welsh Cycling & Newport Live Celebration Track Event; United Kingdom 3–4 November 2023 CL2	Scratch	(United Kingdom) Josh Charlton (United Kingdom) Anna Morris	(Republic of Ireland) Matti Dobbins (United Kingdom) Jenny Holl	(United Kingdom) Rhys Britton (United Kingdom) Megan Barker	
Welsh Cycling & Newport Live Celebration Track Event; United Kingdom 3–4 November 2023 CL2	Sprint	(United Kingdom) Harry Ledingham-Horn (Germany) Emma Hinze	(United Kingdom) Niall Monks (United Kingdom) Milly Tanner	(United Kingdom) Lyall Craig (United Kingdom) Iona Moir	
Welsh Cycling & Newport Live Celebration Track Event; United Kingdom 3–4 November 2023 CL2	Men's Madison	(United Kingdom) Matthew Brennan (United Kingdom) Jed Smithson	(United Kingdom) Matthew Bostock (United Kingdom) Joe Holt	(Argentina) Mateo Duque (United Kingdom) Kieran Riley	
Welsh Cycling & Newport Live Celebration Track Event; United Kingdom 3–4 November 2023 CL2	Omnium	(United Kingdom) Josh Charlton (United Kingdom) Jessica Roberts	(United Kingdom) Matthew Brennan (United Kingdom) Megan Barker	(United Kingdom) Joe Holt (United Kingdom) Anna Morris	
Welsh Cycling & Newport Live Celebration Track Event; United Kingdom 3–4 November 2023 CL2	Women's Points Race	(United Kingdom) Jenny Holl	(United Kingdom) Megan Barker	(United Kingdom) Jessica Roberts	
2023 UCI Track Champions League - Round 3 France 4 November 2023 TCL
2023 UCI Track Champions League - Round 3 France 4 November 2023 TCL	Keirin	(Netherlands) Harrie Lavreysen (Germany) Alessa-Catriona Pröpster	(Poland) Mateusz Rudyk (Belgium) Nicky Degrendele	(Australia) Matthew Richardson (New Zealand) Ellesse Andrews	
2023 UCI Track Champions League - Round 3 France 4 November 2023 TCL	Sprint	(Australia) Matthew Richardson (New Zealand) Ellesse Andrews	(Netherlands) Harrie Lavreysen (Canada) Kelsey Mitchell	(Poland) Mateusz Rudyk (Colombia) Martha Bayona	
2023 UCI Track Champions League - Round 3 France 4 November 2023 TCL	Elimination Race	(Canada) Dylan Bibic (United Kingdom) Katie Archibald	(Belgium) Jules Hesters (Norway) Anita Stenberg	(Spain) Sebastián Mora (Republic of Ireland) Lara Gillespie	
2023 UCI Track Champions League - Round 3 France 4 November 2023 TCL	Scratch	(Canada) Dylan Bibic (Canada) Sarah Van Dam	(Canada) Mathias Guillemette (Canada) Maggie Coles-Lyster	(Belgium) Tuur Dens (United Kingdom) Katie Archibald	
TCL Points Race - Paris; France 4 November 2023 CL2
TCL Points Race - Paris; France 4 November 2023 CL2	Points Race	(Spain) Sebastián Mora (Norway) Anita Stenberg	(United States) Gavin Hoover (Republic of Ireland) Lara Gillespie	(Japan) Eiya Hashimoto (United States) Lily Williams	
2023 UCI Track Champions League - Round 4 United Kingdom 10 November 2023 TCL
2023 UCI Track Champions League - Round 4 United Kingdom 10 November 2023 TCL	Keirin	(Colombia) Kevin Quintero (Colombia) Martha Bayona	(Netherlands) Harrie Lavreysen (New Zealand) Ellesse Andrews	(Australia) Matthew Richardson (United Kingdom) Emma Finucane	
2023 UCI Track Champions League - Round 4 United Kingdom 10 November 2023 TCL	Sprint	(Netherlands) Harrie Lavreysen (Germany) Alessa-Catriona Pröpster	(Australia) Matthew Richardson (United Kingdom) Katy Marchant	(Poland) Mateusz Rudyk (United Kingdom) Emma Finucane	
2023 UCI Track Champions League - Round 4 United Kingdom 10 November 2023 TCL	Elimination Race	(United Kingdom) William Tidball (United Kingdom) Katie Archibald	(Belgium) Jules Hesters (Norway) Anita Stenberg	(Spain) Sebastián Mora (Republic of Ireland) Lara Gillespie	
2023 UCI Track Champions League - Round 4 United Kingdom 10 November 2023 TCL	Scratch	(Netherlands) Roy Eefting (United Kingdom) Dannielle Khan	(Canada) Dylan Bibic (United States) Lily Williams	(Denmark) Tobias Hansen (United Kingdom) Sophie Lewis	
TCL Points Race - London; United Kingdom 10 November 2023 CL2
TCL Points Race - London; United Kingdom 10 November 2023 CL2	Points Race	(Spain) Sebastián Mora (United Kingdom) Neah Evans	(Japan) Eiya Hashimoto (Norway) Anita Stenberg	(United Kingdom) William Perrett (Czech Republic) Petra Ševčíková	
Scratch, Elimination and Points Race; Denmark 10–11 November 2023 CL2
Scratch, Elimination and Points Race; Denmark 10–11 November 2023 CL2	Elimination Race	(New Zealand) Aaron Gate (Denmark) Amalie Dideriksen	(Denmark) Michael Mørkøv (Norway) Nora Tveit	(Netherlands) Jan-Willem van Schip (Netherlands) Marit Raaijmakers	
Scratch, Elimination and Points Race; Denmark 10–11 November 2023 CL2	Scratch	(Denmark) Oskar Winkler (Denmark) Ida Fialla	(Denmark) Niklas Larsen (Denmark) Amalie Dideriksen	(Netherlands) Yanne Dorenbos (Finland) Wilma Aintila	
Scratch, Elimination and Points Race; Denmark 10–11 November 2023 CL2	Men's Points Race	(New Zealand) Aaron Gate	(Denmark) Matias Malmberg	(Denmark) Michael Mørkøv	
2023 UCI Track Champions League - Round 5 United Kingdom 11 November 2023 TCL
2023 UCI Track Champions League - Round 5 United Kingdom 11 November 2023 TCL	Keirin	(Netherlands) Harrie Lavreysen (New Zealand) Ellesse Andrews	(Australia) Matthew Richardson (Colombia) Martha Bayona	(Poland) Mateusz Rudyk (United Kingdom) Emma Finucane	
2023 UCI Track Champions League - Round 5 United Kingdom 11 November 2023 TCL	Sprint	(Australia) Matthew Richardson (New Zealand) Ellesse Andrews	(Netherlands) Harrie Lavreysen (Colombia) Martha Bayona	(New Zealand) Callum Saunders (Germany) Alessa-Catriona Pröpster	
2023 UCI Track Champions League - Round 5 United Kingdom 11 November 2023 TCL	Elimination Race	(Belgium) Tuur Dens (Republic of Ireland) Lara Gillespie	(Belgium) Jules Hesters (Norway) Anita Stenberg	(Netherlands) Philip Heijnen (United Kingdom) Katie Archibald	
2023 UCI Track Champions League - Round 5 United Kingdom 11 November 2023 TCL	Scratch	(United Kingdom) Mark Stewart (United Kingdom) Neah Evans	(United Kingdom) William Perrett (Republic of Ireland) Lara Gillespie	(Spain) Sebastián Mora (Lithuania) Olivija Baleišytė	
Lotto Zesdaagse Vlaanderen-Gent; Belgium 14–19 November 2023 CL1
Lotto Zesdaagse Vlaanderen-Gent; Belgium 14–19 November 2023 CL1	Men's Madison	(Belgium) Lindsay De Vylder (Belgium) Robbe Ghys	(Netherlands) Yoeri Havik (Netherlands) Jan-Willem van Schip	(Belgium) Fabio Van den Bossche (Belgium) Jules Hesters	
Lotto Zesdaagse Vlaanderen-Gent; Belgium 14–19 November 2023 CL1	Women's Omnium				
Lotto Zesdaagse Vlaanderen-Gent; Belgium 14–19 November 2023 CL1	Women's Points Race	(Belgium) Lotte Kopecky	(France) Victoire Berteau	(Netherlands) Marit Raaijmakers	
Japan Track Cup I Japan 16 November 2023 CL1
Japan Track Cup I Japan 16 November 2023 CL1	Keirin	(Japan) Kaiya Ota (Japan) Mina Sato	(Japan) Shinji Nakano (Japan) Riyu Ohta	(Japan) Ichiro Morita (Japan) Fuko Umekawa	
Japan Track Cup I Japan 16 November 2023 CL1	Omnium	(Japan) Kazushige Kuboki (Japan) Yumi Kajihara	(Japan) Shunsuke Imamura (Japan) Tsuyaka Uchino	(United States) Grant Koontz (Japan) Maho Kakita	
Japan Track Cup I Japan 16 November 2023 CL1	Sprint	(Japan) Kaiya Ota (Japan) Mina Sato	(Japan) Shinji Nakano (Japan) Riyu Ohta	(Japan) Yuta Obara (Japan) Fuko Umekawa	
Japan Track Cup I Japan 16 November 2023 CL1	Madison	(Japan) Kazushige Kuboki (Japan) Naoki Kojima (Japan) Maho Kakita (Japan) Tsuyaka Uchino	(Japan) Eiya Hashimoto (Japan) Tetsuo Yamamoto (Japan) Yumi Kajihara (Japan) Mizuki Ikeda	(Japan) Shunsuke Imamura (Japan) Katsuya Okamoto (Hong Kong) Lee Sze Wing (Hong Kong) Yang Qianyu	
Japan Track Cup II; Japan 17–18 November 2023 CL1
Japan Track Cup II; Japan 17–18 November 2023 CL1	Keirin	(Japan) Shinji Nakano (Japan) Riyu Ohta	(Japan) Kento Yamasaki (Japan) Mina Sato	(Japan) Kaiya Ota (Japan) Fuko Umekawa	
Japan Track Cup II; Japan 17–18 November 2023 CL1	Omnium	(Japan) Naoki Kojima (Japan) Yumi Kajihara	(Japan) Eiya Hashimoto (Japan) Tsuyaka Uchino	(Japan) Kazushige Kuboki (Japan) Maho Kakita	
Japan Track Cup II; Japan 17–18 November 2023 CL1	Sprint	(Japan) Kaiya Ota (Japan) Mina Sato	(Japan) Shinji Nakano (Japan) Riyu Ohta	(Japan) Kento Yamasaki (Japan) Fuko Umekawa	
Japan Track Cup II; Japan 17–18 November 2023 CL1	Madison	(Japan) Kazushige Kuboki (Japan) Naoki Kojima (Japan) Maho Kakita (Japan) Tsuyaka Uchino	(Japan) Shunsuke Imamura (Japan) Katsuya Okamoto (Japan) Kie Furuyama (Japan) Mizuki Ikeda	(Japan) Shoi Matsuda (Japan) Shoki Kawano (Japan) Ayana Mizutani (Japan) Misaki Okamoto	
Grand Prix de la ville d'Aigle; Switzerland 18 November 2023 CL2
Grand Prix de la ville d'Aigle; Switzerland 18 November 2023 CL2	Men's Omnium	(Switzerland) Matteo Constant	(Argentina) Mateo Duque	(Ukraine) Heorhii Antonenko	
Arab Track Championships; Egypt 23–25 November 2023 JR
Arab Track Championships; Egypt 23–25 November 2023 JR	Elimination Race	(United Arab Emirates) Mohammed Yousef Al-Mansoori (Egypt) Ebtissam Mohamed	(Saudi Arabia) Azzam Al-Abdulmunim (Egypt) Shahd Mohamed	(United Arab Emirates) Ahmed Al-Mansoori (United Arab Emirates) Zahra Hussain	
Arab Track Championships; Egypt 23–25 November 2023 JR	Individual Pursuit	(United Arab Emirates) Mohammad Al-Mutaiwei (Egypt) Ebtissam Mohamed	(Egypt) Mahmoud Bakr (United Arab Emirates) Zahra Hussain	(Saudi Arabia) Alhur Al-Kulaif (Saudi Arabia) Daniah Sembawa	
Arab Track Championships; Egypt 23–25 November 2023 JR	Team Sprint	(United Arab Emirates) Ahmed Al-Mansoori (United Arab Emirates) Mohammed Yousef Al-Mansoori (United Arab Emirates) Hussain Mohannad Al-Najjar (Egypt) Ebtissam Mohamed (Egypt) Nada Aboubalash (Egypt) Shahd Mohamed	(Egypt) Youssef Abou el-Hassan (Egypt) Mahmoud Bakr (Egypt) Begad Saad (United Arab Emirates) Zahra Hussain (United Arab Emirates) Shaikha Rashed (United Arab Emirates) Safia Al-Sayegh	(Algeria) El Khacib Sassane (Algeria) Yacine Hamza (Algeria) Mohamed Nadjib Assal (Saudi Arabia) Fatima Aleisa (Saudi Arabia) Daniah Sembawa (Saudi Arabia) Nouf Al-Shamrani	
Arab Track Championships; Egypt 23–25 November 2023 JR	Team Pursuit	(United Arab Emirates) Ahmed Al-Mansoori (United Arab Emirates) Waleed Al-Naqbi (United Arab Emirates) Mohammed Yousef Al-Mansoori (United Arab Emirates) Mohammad Al-Mutaiwei	(Algeria) Lotfi Tchambaz (Algeria) Mohamed Nadjib Assal (Algeria) El Khacib Sassane (Algeria) Yacine Hamza	(Saudi Arabia) Hassan Al-Jumah (Saudi Arabia) Ghassan Malibari (Saudi Arabia) Alhur Al-Kulaif (Saudi Arabia) Salman Al-Rebh	
Arab Track Championships; Egypt 23–25 November 2023 JR	Scratch	(United Arab Emirates) Khaled Mayouf (Egypt) Ebtissam Mohamed	(Saudi Arabia) Azzam Al-Abdulmunim (Saudi Arabia) Daniah Sembawa	(United Arab Emirates) Ahmed Al-Mansoori (Egypt) Nada Aboubalash	
Arab Track Championships; Egypt 23–25 November 2023 JR	Sprint	(Saudi Arabia) Azzam Al-Abdulmunim (Egypt) Shahd Mohamed	(Algeria) Yacine Hamza (Saudi Arabia) Daniah Sembawa	(Algeria) Mohamed Nadjib Assal (Algeria) Yasmine El-Meddah	
Arab Track Championships; Egypt 23–25 November 2023 JR	Points Race	(United Arab Emirates) Saif Al Kaabi (Egypt) Ebtissam Mohamed	(United Arab Emirates) Abdulla Al Hammadi (Egypt) Aya Mohamed	(Saudi Arabia) Hassan Al-Jumah (Saudi Arabia) Daniah Sembawa	
Arab Track Championships; Egypt 23–25 November 2023 JR	Madison	(Egypt) Youssef Abou el-Hassan (Egypt) Mahmoud Bakr	(United Arab Emirates) Mohammed Yousef Al-Mansoori (United Arab Emirates) Abdulla Al Hammadi	(Algeria) Lotfi Tchambaz (Algeria) Mohamed Nadjib Assal	
Arab Track Championships; Egypt 23–25 November 2023 JR	Omnium	(United Arab Emirates) Saif Al Kaabi (Egypt) Ebtissam Mohamed	(United Arab Emirates) Ahmed Al-Mansoori (Egypt) Nada Aboubalash	(Saudi Arabia) Hassan Al-Jumah (United Arab Emirates) Zahra Hussain	
Arab Track Championships; Egypt 23–25 November 2023 JR	Time Trial	(Saudi Arabia) Azzam Al-Abdulmunim (Egypt) Shahd Mohamed	(Algeria) El Khacib Sassane (United Arab Emirates) Safia Al-Sayegh	(United Arab Emirates) Ahmed Al-Mansoori (Saudi Arabia) Daniah Sembawa	
Arab Track Championships; Egypt 23–25 November 2023 JR	Keirin	(Algeria) Yacine Hamza (Egypt) Shahd Mohamed	(Algeria) Mohamed Nadjib Assal (United Arab Emirates) Safia Al-Sayegh	(Egypt) Youssef Abou el-Hassan (United Arab Emirates) Shaikha Rashed	
4 jours de Genève; Switzerland 23–26 November 2023 CL1
4 jours de Genève; Switzerland 23–26 November 2023 CL1	Elimination Race	(Denmark) Tobias Hansen (Spain) Eukene Larrarte	(United Kingdom) Josh Tarling (Switzerland) Jasmin Liechti	(United States) Colby Lange (United Kingdom) Grace Lister	
4 jours de Genève; Switzerland 23–26 November 2023 CL1	Madison	(France) Joseph Berlin-Sémon (Denmark) Robin Juel Skivild (United States) Lily Williams (United States) Jennifer Valente	(Switzerland) Simon Vitzthum (Switzerland) Lukas Rüegg (Netherlands) Babette van der Wolf (Republic of Ireland) Mia Griffin	(Germany) Moritz Augenstein (Germany) Moritz Malcharek (United Kingdom) Grace Lister (United Kingdom) Kate Richardson	
4 jours de Genève; Switzerland 23–26 November 2023 CL1	Omnium	(Denmark) Tobias Hansen (United States) Jennifer Valente	(United Kingdom) Josh Tarling (United Kingdom) Jessica Roberts	(Switzerland) Simon Vitzthum (France) Clémence Chereau	
4 jours de Genève; Switzerland 23–26 November 2023 CL1	Scratch	(Denmark) Tobias Hansen (Switzerland) Jasmin Liechti	(France) Clément Petit (United Kingdom) Kate Richardson	(Italy) Matteo Donegà (Republic of Ireland) Mia Griffin	
Nordic Track Cycling Championship 2023; Lithuania 25–26 November 2023 CL2
Nordic Track Cycling Championship 2023; Lithuania 25–26 November 2023 CL2	Men's Sprint	(Lithuania) Vasilijus Lendel	(Ukraine) Vladyslav Denysenko	(Ukraine) Bohdan Danylchuk	
Nordic Track Cycling Championship 2023; Lithuania 25–26 November 2023 CL2	Men's Scratch	(Ukraine) Vitaliy Hryniv	(Ukraine) Daniil Yakovlev	(Sweden) Gustav Johansson	
Nordic Track Cycling Championship 2023; Lithuania 25–26 November 2023 CL2	Men's Elimination Race	(Ukraine) Daniil Yakovlev	(Lithuania) Rokas Adomaitis	(Ukraine) Roman Gladysh	
Nordic Track Cycling Championship 2023; Lithuania 25–26 November 2023 CL2	Keirin	(Lithuania) Vasilijus Lendel (Ukraine) Oleksandra Lohviniuk	(Ukraine) Vladyslav Denysenko (Ukraine) Alla Biletska	(Ukraine) Bohdan Danylchuk (Lithuania) Miglė Lendel	
Nordic Track Cycling Championship 2023; Lithuania 25–26 November 2023 CL2	Men's Omnium	(Ukraine) Vitaliy Hryniv	(Sweden) Gustav Johansson	(Ukraine) Roman Gladysh	
JICF International Track Cup; Japan 25–26 November 2023 CL2
JICF International Track Cup; Japan 25–26 November 2023 CL2	Madison	(Japan) Shunsuke Imamura (Japan) Naoki Kojima (Japan) Maho Kakita (Japan) Mizuki Ikeda	(Japan) Tetsuo Yamamoto (Japan) Shoki Kawano (Hong Kong) Lee Sze Wing (Hong Kong) Yang Qianyu	(United States) Grant Koontz (United States) Ryan Jastrab (Hong Kong) Sze Wing Ng (Hong Kong) Leung Wing Yee	
JICF International Track Cup; Japan 25–26 November 2023 CL2	Keirin	(Japan) Ryoya Mikami (Japan) Uta Kume	(Hong Kong) Cheuk Hei To (Hong Kong) Sze Wing Ng	(Hong Kong) Tsun Ho Yung (Hong Kong) Cho Yiu Yeung	
JICF International Track Cup; Japan 25–26 November 2023 CL2	Sprint	(Japan) Ryoya Mikami (Hong Kong) Cho Yiu Yeung	(Hong Kong) Cheuk Hei To (Japan) Aki Sakai	(New Zealand) Dylan Keith Alby Day (Japan) Uta Kume	
JICF International Track Cup; Japan 25–26 November 2023 CL2	Omnium	(Japan) Naoki Kojima (Japan) Yumi Kajihara	(Japan) Shunsuke Imamura (Japan) Maho Kakita	(United States) Grant Koontz (Hong Kong) Lee Sze Wing	
Copenhagen Race Night; Denmark 30 November 2023 CL2
Copenhagen Race Night; Denmark 30 November 2023 CL2	Men's Scratch	(Denmark) Niklas Larsen	(Denmark) Tobias Hansen	(Germany) Max Briese	
Copenhagen Race Night; Denmark 30 November 2023 CL2	Men's Elimination Race	(Denmark) Tobias Hansen	(Norway) Karsten Feldmann	(Denmark) Julius Johansen	
Copenhagen Race Night; Denmark 30 November 2023 CL2	Men's Madison	(Denmark) Niklas Larsen (Denmark) Tobias Hansen	(Denmark) Carl-Frederik Bévort (Denmark) Frederik Rodenberg	(Denmark) Rasmus Bøgh Wallin (Denmark) Gustav Wang	
Grand Prix Poland UCI 2 Poland 8–10 December 2023 CL2
Grand Prix Poland UCI 2 Poland 8–10 December 2023 CL2	Elimination Race	(Poland) Filip Prokopyszyn (Poland) Maja Tracka	(Poland) Radosław Frątczak (Poland) Olga Wankiewicz	(Poland) Dominik Ratajczak (Poland) Patrycja Lorkowska	
Grand Prix Poland UCI 2 Poland 8–10 December 2023 CL2	Individual Pursuit	(Poland) Adam Woźniak (Poland) Olga Wankiewicz	(Belgium) Thibaut Bernard (Poland) Karolina Karasiewicz	(Lithuania) Jomantas Venckus (Poland) Maja Tracka	
Grand Prix Poland UCI 2 Poland 8–10 December 2023 CL2	Keirin	(Poland) Mateusz Rudyk (Poland) Paulina Petri	(France) Tom Derache (France) Taky Marie-Divine Kouamé	(Poland) Konrad Burawski (Czech Republic) Veronika Jaborníková	
Grand Prix Poland UCI 2 Poland 8–10 December 2023 CL2	Scratch	(Belgium) Thibaut Bernard (Egypt) Ebtissam Mohamed	(Argentina) Mateo Duque Cano (Ukraine) Tetyana Klimchenko	(Poland) Alan Banaszek (Poland) Maja Tracka	
Grand Prix Poland UCI 2 Poland 8–10 December 2023 CL2	Sprint	(Poland) Mateusz Rudyk (Poland) Nikola Sibiak	(Lithuania) Vasilijus Lendel (Poland) Paulina Petri	(France) Rayan Helal (France) Taky Marie-Divine Kouamé	
Grand Prix Poland UCI 2 Poland 8–10 December 2023 CL2	Omnium	(Poland) Alan Banaszek (Poland) Karolina Karasiewicz	(Austria) Tim Wafler (Poland) Olga Wankiewicz	(Poland) Adam Woźniak (Poland) Patrycja Lorkowska	
Grand Prix Poland UCI 2 Poland 8–10 December 2023 CL2	Points Race	(Austria) Felix Ritzinger (Poland) Karolina Karasiewicz	(United Kingdom) Ben Marsh (Ukraine) Tetiana Yashchenko	(Poland) Bartosz Rudyk (Uzbekistan) Margarita Misyurina	
Grand Prix Poland UCI 2 Poland 8–10 December 2023 CL2	Madison	(Poland) Alan Banaszek (Poland) Adam Woźniak (Poland) Patrycja Lorkowska (Poland) Olga Wankiewicz	(Austria) Raphael Kokas (Austria) Felix Ritzinger (Poland) Karolina Karasiewicz (Poland) Nikol Płosaj	(Poland) Filip Prokopyszyn (France) Dorian Carreau (France) Lara Lallemant (France) Clémence Chereau	
Grand Prix Poland UCI 2 Poland 8–10 December 2023 CL2	Team Sprint	(Poland) Mateusz Rudyk (Poland) Daniel Rochna (Poland) Maciej Bielecki (Poland) Marlena Karwacka (Poland) Urszula Łoś (Poland) Nikola Sibiak (Poland) Paulina Petri	(France) Melvin Landerneau (France) Rayan Helal (France) Tom Derache (France) Marie Louisa Drouode (France) Taky Marie-Divine Kouamé (France) Julie Michaux	(Czech Republic) Dominik Topinka (Czech Republic) Martin Čechman (Czech Republic) Jakub Šťastný (Czech Republic) Veronika Jaborníková (Czech Republic) Michaela Poulová (Czech Republic) Anna Jaborníková	
Six Days of Rotterdam; Netherlands 12–17 December 2023 CL2
Six Days of Rotterdam; Netherlands 12–17 December 2023 CL2	Men's Madison	(Netherlands) Yoeri Havik (Netherlands) Jan-Willem van Schip	(Belgium) Lindsay De Vylder (Belgium) Jules Hesters	(Netherlands) Vincent Hoppezak (Netherlands) Philip Heijnen	
APL New Zealand Grand Prix; New Zealand 9–10 December 2023 CL2
APL New Zealand Grand Prix; New Zealand 9–10 December 2023 CL2	Elimination Race	(New Zealand) Corbin Strong (New Zealand) Ally Wollaston	(New Zealand) Keegan Hornblow (New Zealand) Bryony Botha	(New Zealand) Campbell Stewart (Japan) Mizuki Ikeda	
APL New Zealand Grand Prix; New Zealand 9–10 December 2023 CL2	Keirin	(New Zealand) Sam Dakin (New Zealand) Rebecca Petch	(New Zealand) Jaxson Russell (New Zealand) Shaane Fulton	(New Zealand) Kaio Lart (Japan) Noa Obara	
APL New Zealand Grand Prix; New Zealand 9–10 December 2023 CL2	Men's Madison	(New Zealand) Tom Sexton (Australia) Kelland O'Brien	(New Zealand) Campbell Stewart (New Zealand) Aaron Gate	(Australia) Bailey O'Donnell (New Zealand) George Jackson	
APL New Zealand Grand Prix; New Zealand 9–10 December 2023 CL2	Omnium	(New Zealand) Aaron Gate (New Zealand) Ally Wollaston	(New Zealand) Tom Sexton (New Zealand) Bryony Botha	(New Zealand) Campbell Stewart (New Zealand) Emily Shearman	
APL New Zealand Grand Prix; New Zealand 9–10 December 2023 CL2	Points Race	(New Zealand) Aaron Gate (New Zealand) Ally Wollaston	(New Zealand) Tom Sexton (New Zealand) Emily Shearman	(New Zealand) Keegan Hornblow (Japan) Mizuki Ikeda	
APL New Zealand Grand Prix; New Zealand 9–10 December 2023 CL2	Women's Scratch	(New Zealand) Ally Wollaston	(New Zealand) Michaela Drummond	(New Zealand) Emily Shearman	
APL New Zealand Grand Prix; New Zealand 9–10 December 2023 CL2	Sprint	(New Zealand) Sam Dakin (New Zealand) Shaane Fulton	(New Zealand) Liam Cavanagh (New Zealand) Olivia King	(New Zealand) Dylan Day (Japan) Noa Obara	
Austral Wheel Race; Australia 15–16 December 2023 CL2
Austral Wheel Race; Australia 15–16 December 2023 CL2	Sprint	(Australia) Leigh Hoffman (Australia) Kristina Clonan	(Australia) Thomas Cornish (Australia) Alessia McCaig	(Australia) Byron Davies (Australia) Molly McGill	
Austral Wheel Race; Australia 15–16 December 2023 CL2	Omnium	(Australia) Graeme Frislie (Australia) Georgia Baker	(Australia) Liam Walsh (Australia) Sophie Edwards	(Australia) Bailey O'Donnell (Australia) Alexandra Manly	
Austral Wheel Race; Australia 15–16 December 2023 CL2	Madison	(Australia) Kelland O'Brien (Australia) Blake Agnoletto (Australia) Georgia Baker (Australia) Alexandra Manly	(Australia) Graeme Frislie (Australia) Liam Walsh (Australia) Sophie Marr (Australia) Keira Will	(Australia) Conor Leahy (Australia) Wil Holmes (Australia) Sally Carter (Australia) Sophie Edwards	
Austral Wheel Race; Australia 15–16 December 2023 CL2	Keirin	(Australia) Thomas Cornish (Australia) Kristina Clonan	(Malaysia) Azizulhasni Awang (Malaysia) Nurul Izzah Izzati Mohd Asri	(Malaysia) Muhammad Shah Firdaus Sahrom (Australia) Selina Ho	
3. Lauf Brandenburger SprintCup 2023; Germany 15–16 December 2023 CL2
3. Lauf Brandenburger SprintCup 2023; Germany 15–16 December 2023 CL2	Keirin	(Poland) Marcin Marciniak (Germany) Clara Schneider	(Germany) Jakob Vogt (Germany) Lara-Sophie Jäger	(Poland) Konrad Burawski (Netherlands) Kimberly Kalee	
3. Lauf Brandenburger SprintCup 2023; Germany 15–16 December 2023 CL2	Sprint	(Poland) Marcin Marciniak (Germany) Clara Schneider	(Czech Republic) Jakub Malášek (Ukraine) Oleksandra Lohviniuk	(Germany) Danny-Luca Werner (Netherlands) Kimberly Kalee	
Track Cycling Challenge; Switzerland 15–16 December 2023 CL1
Track Cycling Challenge; Switzerland 15–16 December 2023 CL1	Elimination Race	(Italy) Elia Viviani (United States) Jennifer Valente	(Italy) Francesco Lamon (Italy) Letizia Paternoster	(Belgium) Robbe Ghys (Poland) Patrycja Lorkowska	
Track Cycling Challenge; Switzerland 15–16 December 2023 CL1	Keirin	(Germany) Maximilian Dörnbach (Germany) Lea Friedrich	(Poland) Mateusz Rudyk (Netherlands) Hetty van de Wouw	(Germany) Luca Spiegel (France) Mathilde Gros	
Track Cycling Challenge; Switzerland 15–16 December 2023 CL1	Scratch	(Belgium) Fabio Van den Bossche (United States) Jennifer Valente	(France) Oscar Nilsson-Julien (Republic of Ireland) Mia Griffin	(United States) Colby Lange (Italy) Martina Fidanza	
Track Cycling Challenge; Switzerland 15–16 December 2023 CL1	Sprint	(Poland) Mateusz Rudyk (Germany) Lea Friedrich	(France) Sébastien Vigier (France) Mathilde Gros	(Lithuania) Vasilijus Lendel (Germany) Emma Hinze	
Track Cycling Challenge; Switzerland 15–16 December 2023 CL1	Omnium	(France) Oscar Nilsson-Julien (Germany) Franziska Brauße	(Belgium) Fabio Van den Bossche (Italy) Letizia Paternoster	(Poland) Alan Banaszek (United Kingdom) Maddie Leech	
Track Cycling Challenge; Switzerland 15–16 December 2023 CL1	Points Race	(Belgium) Fabio Van den Bossche (United States) Jennifer Valente	(United States) Colby Lange (United Kingdom) Kate Richardson	(United Kingdom) Oliver Wood (United Kingdom) Maddie Leech	
Track Cycling Challenge; Switzerland 15–16 December 2023 CL1	Madison	(Italy) Elia Viviani (Italy) Michele Scartezzini (Italy) Martina Fidanza (Italy) Letizia Paternoster	(United States) Colby Lange (United States) Grant Koontz (United States) Jennifer Valente (United States) Megan Jastrab	(Belgium) Fabio Van den Bossche (Belgium) Robbe Ghys (Republic of Ireland) Alice Sharpe (Republic of Ireland) Mia Griffin	
Troféu Internacional de Pista - José Bento Pessoa; Portugal 16 December 2023 CL2
Troféu Internacional de Pista - José Bento Pessoa; Portugal 16 December 2023 CL2	Men's Madison	(Portugal) Iúri Leitão (Portugal) Diogo Narciso	(Spain) Francesc Bennassar (Spain) Erik Martorell	(Austria) Felix Ritzinger (Austria) Tim Wafler	
Troféu Internacional de Pista - José Bento Pessoa; Portugal 16 December 2023 CL2	Omnium	(Portugal) Iúri Leitão (Spain) Eukene Larrarte	(Mexico) Fernando Gabriel Nava Romo (Portugal) Maria Martins	(Spain) Erik Martorell (Mexico) Yareli Acevedo	
Troféu Internacional de Pista - Alves Barbosa; Portugal 17 December 2023 CL2
Troféu Internacional de Pista - Alves Barbosa; Portugal 17 December 2023 CL2	Women's Points Race	(Spain) Isabel Ferreres	(Spain) Laura Rodríguez Cordero	(Portugal) Daniela Campos	
Troféu Internacional de Pista - Alves Barbosa; Portugal 17 December 2023 CL2	Men's Madison	(Portugal) Iúri Leitão (Portugal) Diogo Narciso	(Spain) Joan Bennassar (Spain) Álvaro Navas	(Spain) Erik Martorell (Spain) Francesc Bennassar	
Troféu Internacional de Pista - Alves Barbosa; Portugal 17 December 2023 CL2	Omnium	(Portugal) Diogo Narciso (Portugal) Maria Martins	(Portugal) Iúri Leitão (Spain) Eukene Larrarte	(Spain) Joan Bennassar (Mexico) Yareli Acevedo	
2023 TasCarnivals; Australia 27–30 December 2023 CL2
2023 TasCarnivals; Australia 27–30 December 2023 CL2	Keirin				
2023 TasCarnivals; Australia 27–30 December 2023 CL2	Sprint				
100 KM international Madison; Denmark 28 December 2023 CL2
100 KM international Madison; Denmark 28 December 2023 CL2	Men's Madison	(Denmark) Robin Juel Skivild (Denmark) Tobias Hansen	(Denmark) Theodor Storm (Denmark) Michael Mørkøv	(Netherlands) Yoeri Havik (Denmark) Julius Johansen	
100 KM international Madison; Denmark 28 December 2023 CL2	Women's Elimination Race	(Denmark) Amalie Dideriksen	(Italy) Silvia Zanardi	(Switzerland) Michelle Andres	
Grand Prix Novo Mesto Slovenia; Slovenia 28–29 December 2023 CL2
Grand Prix Novo Mesto Slovenia; Slovenia 28–29 December 2023 CL2	Men's Madison	(Italy) Manlio Moro (Italy) Niccolò Galli	(Austria) Maximilian Schmidbauer (Austria) Felix Ritzinger	(Austria) Tim Wafler (Austria) Raphael Kokas	
Grand Prix Novo Mesto Slovenia; Slovenia 28–29 December 2023 CL2	Men's Points Race	(Austria) Felix Ritzinger	(Austria) Maximilian Schmidbauer	(Israel) Rotem Tene	
Grand Prix Odense; Denmark 29 December 2023 CL2
Grand Prix Odense; Denmark 29 December 2023 CL2	Madison	(Denmark) Lasse Norman Leth (Denmark) Tobias Hansen (Denmark) Amalie Dideriksen (Switzerland) Michelle Andres	(Denmark) Robin Juel Skivild (Denmark) Julius Johansen (Italy) Silvia Zanardi (Germany) Marla Sigmund	(Italy) Elia Viviani (Italy) Simone Consonni (Denmark) Ida Krum (Denmark) Ellen Klinge	

== 2023 UCI Track Cycling World Championships ==
=== Men ===
Event	Gold	Silver	Bronze
Individual pursuit	Filippo Ganna; Italy	Daniel Bigham; Great Britain	Jonathan Milan; Italy
Team pursuit	Denmark; Niklas Larsen; Carl-Frederik Bévort; Lasse Norman Leth; Rasmus Pedersen; Frederik Madsen	Italy; Filippo Ganna; Francesco Lamon; Jonathan Milan; Manlio Moro; Simone Consonni	New Zealand; Aaron Gate; Campbell Stewart; Thomas Sexton; Nick Kergozou
Sprint	Harrie Lavreysen; Netherlands	Nicholas Paul; Trinidad and Tobago	Jack Carlin; Great Britain
Team sprint	Netherlands; Roy van den Berg; Harrie Lavreysen; Jeffrey Hoogland	Australia; Leigh Hoffman; Matthew Richardson; Matthew Glaetzer; Thomas Cornish	France; Florian Grengbo; Sébastien Vigier; Rayan Helal
Keirin	Kevin Quintero; Colombia	Matthew Richardson; Australia	Shinji Nakano; Japan
Madison	Netherlands; Jan Willem van Schip; Yoeri Havik	Great Britain; Oliver Wood; Mark Stewart	New Zealand; Aaron Gate; Campbell Stewart
Omnium	Iúri Leitão; Portugal	Benjamin Thomas; France	Shunsuke Imamura; Japan
Scratch	William Tidball; Great Britain	Kazushige Kuboki; Japan	Tuur Dens; Belgium
Points race	Aaron Gate; New Zealand	Albert Torres; Spain	Fabio Van den Bossche; Belgium
Elimination	Ethan Vernon; Great Britain	Dylan Bibic; Canada	Elia Viviani; Italy
1 km time trial	Jeffrey Hoogland; Netherlands	Matthew Glaetzer; Australia	Thomas Cornish; Australia

=== Women ===
Event	Gold	Silver	Bronze
Individual pursuit	Chloé Dygert; United States	Franziska Brauße; Germany	Bryony Botha; New Zealand
Team pursuit	Great Britain; Katie Archibald; Elinor Barker; Josie Knight; Anna Morris; Megan Barker	New Zealand; Michaela Drummond; Ally Wollaston; Emily Shearman; Bryony Botha	France; Marion Borras; Valentine Fortin; Clara Copponi; Marie Le Net; Victoire Berteau
Sprint	Emma Finucane; Great Britain	Lea Friedrich; Germany	Ellesse Andrews; New Zealand
Team sprint	Germany; Pauline Grabosch; Emma Hinze; Lea Friedrich	Great Britain; Lauren Bell; Sophie Capewell; Emma Finucane	China; Guo Yufang; Bao Shanju; Yuan Liying
Keirin	Ellesse Andrews; New Zealand	Martha Bayona; Colombia	Lea Friedrich; Germany
Madison	Great Britain; Neah Evans; Elinor Barker	Australia; Georgia Baker; Alexandra Manly	France; Victoire Berteau; Clara Copponi
Omnium	Jennifer Valente; United States	Amalie Dideriksen; Denmark	Lotte Kopecky; Belgium
Scratch	Jennifer Valente; United States	Maike van der Duin; Netherlands	Michaela Drummond; New Zealand
Points race	Lotte Kopecky; Belgium	Georgia Baker; Australia	Tsuyaka Uchino; Japan
Elimination	Lotte Kopecky; Belgium	Valentine Fortin; France	Jennifer Valente; United States
500 m time trial	Emma Hinze; Germany	Kristina Clonan; Australia	Lea Friedrich; Germany

== National Championships ==
=== Individual Pursuit ===
Date	Venue	Podium (Men)		Podium (Women)	
17–20 November 2022	Romania; Plovdiv (Bulgaria)	1	Daniel Crista	1	Noelle Priscilla Darabant-Hușanu
17–20 November 2022	Romania; Plovdiv (Bulgaria)	2	Valentin Plesea	2	
17–20 November 2022	Romania; Plovdiv (Bulgaria)	3	Mihai Băbăiță	3	
26 November 2022	Czech Republic; Prague	1	Milan Kadlec	1	
26 November 2022	Czech Republic; Prague	2	Matyáš Koblížek	2	
26 November 2022	Czech Republic; Prague	3	Denis Rugovac	3	
9–11 December 2022	Indonesia; Surakarta	1	Aiman Cahyadi	1	Liontin Evangelina
9–11 December 2022	Indonesia; Surakarta	2	Yosandy Oetomo	2	Dewika Mulya Sova
9–11 December 2022	Indonesia; Surakarta	3	Dealton Prayogo	3	Ananda Diva
9–11 December 2022	Norway; Sola	1	Iver Knotten	1	Sonja Moi
9–11 December 2022	Norway; Sola	2	Sondre Weiseth	2	
9–11 December 2022	Norway; Sola	3	Fredrik Nordahl Fløisvik	3	
10–11 December 2022	Chile; Santiago	1	Héctor Quintana	1	Aranza Villalón
10–11 December 2022	Chile; Santiago	2	Josafat Cárdenas	2	Catalina Soto
10–11 December 2022	Chile; Santiago	3	Matías Arriagada	3	Camila García Donoso
10–11 December 2022	Sweden; Falun	1	Christoffer Eriksson	1	
10–11 December 2022	Sweden; Falun	2	Erik Åkesson	2	
10–11 December 2022	Sweden; Falun	3	Jonas Månsson	3	
10–14 December 2022	India; Guwahati	1	Vishavjeet Singh	1	Meenakshi Rohilla
10–14 December 2022	India; Guwahati	2	Dinesh Kumar	2	Swasti Singh
10–14 December 2022	India; Guwahati	3	Manjeet Singh	3	Khoirom Rejiya Devi
27–29 December 2022	Netherlands; Apeldoorn	1	Brian Megens	1	Marit Raaijmakers
27–29 December 2022	Netherlands; Apeldoorn	2	Wessel Mouris	2	Lisa van Belle
27–29 December 2022	Netherlands; Apeldoorn	3	Cesar Beilo	3	Tessa Dijksman
2 January 2023	Belgium; Ghent	1	Thibaut Bernard	1	Lotte Kopecky
2 January 2023	Belgium; Ghent	2	Milan Van den Haute	2	Marith Vanhove
2 January 2023	Belgium; Ghent	3	Brem Deman	3	Hélène Hesters
5 January 2023	France; Roubaix	1	Benjamin Thomas	1	Valentine Fortin
5 January 2023	France; Roubaix	2	Corentin Ermenault	2	Marion Borras
5 January 2023	France; Roubaix	3	Valentin Tabellion	3	Jade Labastugue
6–8 January 2023	Canada; Milton	1	Michael Foley	1	Ariane Bonhomme
6–8 January 2023	Canada; Milton	2	Dylan Bibic	2	Fiona Majendie
6–8 January 2023	Canada; Milton	3	Carson Mattern	3	Ruby West
14 January 2023	Denmark; Odense	1	Anders Fynbo	1	
14 January 2023	Denmark; Odense	2	Ian Millennium	2	
14 January 2023	Denmark; Odense	3	Sebastian Juul	3	Ellen Klinge
26–29 January 2023	United Kingdom; Newport	1	Charlie Tanfield	1	Neah Evans
26–29 January 2023	United Kingdom; Newport	2	Michael Gill	2	Ella Barnwell
26–29 January 2023	United Kingdom; Newport	3	William Roberts	3	Francesca Hall
7 February 2023	Mexico; Guadalajara	1	Sebastián Ruiz Terán	1	Yareli Acevedo
7 February 2023	Mexico; Guadalajara	2	Ignacio Prado	2	Victoria Velasco
7 February 2023	Mexico; Guadalajara	3	Edibaldo Maldonado	3	Lizbeth Salazar
1–5 March 2023	New Zealand; Invercargill	1	Edward Pawson	1	Amelia Sykes
1–5 March 2023	New Zealand; Invercargill	2	Oliver Watson-Palmer	2	Samantha Walker
1–5 March 2023	New Zealand; Invercargill	3	Hunter Gough	3	Belle Judd
9 March 2023	Belarus; Minsk	1	Yauheni Karaliok	1	Hanna Tserakh
9 March 2023	Belarus; Minsk	2	Dzianis Mazur	2	Karolina Biriuk
9 March 2023	Belarus; Minsk	3	Raman Tsishkou	3	Anastasia Kipitkova
10 March 2023	United Arab Emirates; Sharjah	1	Mohammed Youcef Al Mansoori	1	
10 March 2023	United Arab Emirates; Sharjah	2	Ahmed Al Mansoori	2	
10 March 2023	United Arab Emirates; Sharjah	3	Mohammad Al Sabbagh	3	
15 March 2023	Australia; Brisbane	1	Conor Leahy	1	Sophie Edwards
15 March 2023	Australia; Brisbane	2	James Moriarty	2	Claudia Marcks
15 March 2023	Australia; Brisbane	3	Oliver Bleddyn	3	Isla Carr
17–19 March 2023	Ecuador; Quito	1	Sebastián Novoa	1	
17–19 March 2023	Ecuador; Quito	2	Kevin Navas	2	
17–19 March 2023	Ecuador; Quito	3	Stalin Wladimir Puentestar	3	
22–24 March 2023	Israel; Tel Aviv	1	Alon Yogev	1	
22–24 March 2023	Israel; Tel Aviv	2	Amit Keinan	2	
22–24 March 2023	Israel; Tel Aviv	3	Shahar Amir	3	
30 March 2023 (Men's); 31 March 2023 (Women's)	Switzerland; Grenchen	1	Claudio Imhof	1	Fabienne Buri
30 March 2023 (Men's); 31 March 2023 (Women's)	Switzerland; Grenchen	2	Noah Bögli	2	Jasmin Liechti
30 March 2023 (Men's); 31 March 2023 (Women's)	Switzerland; Grenchen	3	Valère Thiébaud	3	Aline Seitz
2 April	South Africa; Cape Town	1	Joshua van Wyk	1	S'Annara Grove
2 April	South Africa; Cape Town	2	Joshua Dike	2	Danielle Van Niekerk
2 April	South Africa; Cape Town	3	Carl Bonthuys	3	Charlissa Schultz
28–30 April	Bolivia; La Paz	1	Marcelo Fabian Vilca Cata	1	Micaela Sarabia Ricaldez
28–30 April	Bolivia; La Paz	2	Joaquín Siles Cohello	2	Brenda Saavedra Zurita
28–30 April	Bolivia; La Paz	3	Rubén Heraldo Montenegro	3	Kenia Karina Almanza Choré
4–8 May	Trinidad and Tobago; Couva	1	Tariq Woods	1	Kanika Paul-Payne
4–8 May	Trinidad and Tobago; Couva	2	Akil Campbell	2	
4–8 May	Trinidad and Tobago; Couva	3	Liam Trepte	3	
14 May	Japan; Shizuoka	1	Shoi Matsuda	1	Tsuyaka Uchino
14 May	Japan; Shizuoka	2	Kazushige Kuboki	2	Maho Kakita
14 May	Japan; Shizuoka	3	Koshin Adachi	3	Mizuki Ikeda
15–19 May	Malaysia; Nilai	1	Abdul Azim Aliyas	1	Nyo Ci Hui
15–19 May	Malaysia; Nilai	2	Nur Aiman Rosli	2	Noor Mastura Norman
15–19 May	Malaysia; Nilai	3	Maximillian Fong Hung Chiat	3	Khairunnisa Aleeya Saifulnizam
19–20 May	Jamaica; Kingston	1	Andrew Ramsay	1	
19–20 May	Jamaica; Kingston	2	Bradley McFarlane	2	
19–20 May	Jamaica; Kingston	3	Horace McFarlane	3	
21 May	Kazakhstan; Astana	1	Alisher Zhumakan	1	Rinata Sultanova
21 May	Kazakhstan; Astana	2	Dmitriy Noskov	2	Marina Kurnossova
21 May	Kazakhstan; Astana	3	Sergey Karmazhakov	3	Violetta Kazakova
2 June	Ukraine; Lviv	1	Vitaliy Hryniv	1	Kateryna Velychko
2 June	Ukraine; Lviv	2	Roman Gladysh	2	Arina Korotieieva
2 June	Ukraine; Lviv	3	Yaroslav Kozakov	3	Irina Semenova
9 June	Spain; Valencia	1	Joan Martí Bennassar	1	Isabella Escalera
9 June	Spain; Valencia	2	Francesc Bennassar	2	Tania Calvo
9 June	Spain; Valencia	3	Alejandro Merenciano	3	Isabel Ferreres
11 June	Latvia; Panevėžys	1	Vitālijs Korņilovs	1	
11 June	Latvia; Panevėžys	2	George Nemilostivijs	2	
11 June	Latvia; Panevėžys	3	Kristians Belohvosciks	3	
14–18 June	Germany; Cottbus	1	Nicolas Heinrich	1	Franziska Brauße
14–18 June	Germany; Cottbus	2	Theo Reinhardt	2	Justyna Czapla
14–18 June	Germany; Cottbus	3	Leon Rohde	3	Lea Lin Teutenberg
17 June	Croatia; Zagreb	1	Lorenzo Marenzi	1	
17 June	Croatia; Zagreb	2	Ivan Greiner	2	
17 June	Croatia; Zagreb	3	Matija Beđić	3	
27–29 June	Italy; Fiorenzuola d'Arda	1	Elia Viviani	1	Letizia Paternoster
27–29 June	Italy; Fiorenzuola d'Arda	2	Bryan Olivo	2	Vittoria Bussi
27–29 June	Italy; Fiorenzuola d'Arda	3	Niccolò Galli	3	Martina Alzini
1–2 July	Georgia; Tbilisi	1	Avtandil Piranishvili	1	
1–2 July	Georgia; Tbilisi	2	Valeri Mamulashvili	2	
1–2 July	Georgia; Tbilisi	3	Giorgi Khorguani	3	
5–9 July	United States; Carson	1	Anders Johnson	1	Elizabeth Stevenson
5–9 July	United States; Carson	2	Spencer Seggebruch	2	Danielle Morshead
5–9 July	United States; Carson	3	Brendan Rhim	3	Bethany Matsick
6–8 July	Azerbaijan; Baku	1	Samir Jabrayilov	1	
6–8 July	Azerbaijan; Baku	2	Nofal Nuriyev	2	
6–8 July	Azerbaijan; Baku	3	Yusif Ismayilov	3	
11–15 July	Iran; Tehran	1	Behnam Ariyan	1	
11–15 July	Iran; Tehran	2	Davood Mohammadabadi	2	
11–15 July	Iran; Tehran	3	Mahdi Aghakashi	3	
14–15 July	Peru; Lima	1	Hugo Ruiz	1	Alejandra Huamaní
14–15 July	Peru; Lima	2	Maximiliano Coila	2	Kaori Quispe
14–15 July	Peru; Lima	3	Robinson Ruiz	3	Bethzabé Coila
20–23 July	Colombia; Medellín	1	Juan Arango	1	Juliana Londoño
20–23 July	Colombia; Medellín	2	Juan Manuel Barboza	2	Lina Hernández
20–23 July	Colombia; Medellín	3	Erin Fabián Espinel	3	Andrea Alzate
23–24 July	Chinese Taipei; Taichung	1	Chang Chih-sheng	1	Zeng Ke-xin
23–24 July	Chinese Taipei; Taichung	2	Chien Yun Tse	2	Chia Chi Lai
23–24 July	Chinese Taipei; Taichung	3	Sheng Hsin Chiu	3	Zu Yun Chuang
27 July	Finland	1	Severi Savukoski	1	Pia Pensaari
27 July	Finland	2	Trond Larsen	2	Ida Sten
27 July	Finland	3	Timo Erjomaa	3	Paula Savolainen
28–30 July	Greece; Athens	1	Polychronis Tzortzakis	1	Argiro Milaki
28–30 July	Greece; Athens	2	Nikolaos Michail Drakos	2	Vasiliki Kokkali
28–30 July	Greece; Athens	3	Nikiforos Arvanitou	3	Eleni Kokoliou
6 August	El Salvador	1		1	
6 August	El Salvador	2		2	
6 August	El Salvador	3		3	
26–27 August	Ireland	1	Conn McDunphy	1	Annalise Murphy
26–27 August	Ireland	2	Sean Landers	2	Gabriella Homer
26–27 August	Ireland	3	Sean Lenehan	3	Aoife O'Brien
15–17 September	Poland	1	Adam Woźniak	1	Olga Wankiewicz
15–17 September	Poland	2	Kacper Majewski	2	Patrycja Lorkowska
15–17 September	Poland	3	Konrad Waliniak	3	Maja Tracka
15–17 September	Thailand	1	Patompob Phonarjthan	1	
15–17 September	Thailand	2	Jetsada Janluang	2	
15–17 September	Thailand	3	Putipong Chaloemsrimueang	3	
23 September	Czech Republic	1	Matyáš Koblížek	1	Kateřina Kohoutková
23 September	Czech Republic	2	Adam Křenek	2	Petra Ševčíková
23 September	Czech Republic	3	Radovan Štec	3	Hana Heřmanovská
27–29 September 2023 (2023 Edition)	Romania; Plovdiv (Bulgaria)	1	Daniel Crista	1	Maria-Ecaterina Stancu
27–29 September 2023 (2023 Edition)	Romania; Plovdiv (Bulgaria)	2	János Török	2	Cătălina Andreea Cătineanu
27–29 September 2023 (2023 Edition)	Romania; Plovdiv (Bulgaria)	3	Valentin Pleşea	3	Georgeta Ungureanu
29 September – 8 October 2023	Costa Rica	1	Jordan Rodríguez Arias	1	Maria Fernanda Sánchez
29 September – 8 October 2023	Costa Rica	2	Jefry Jiménez	2	
29 September – 8 October 2023	Costa Rica	3	Luis Pablo Solano	3	
4–8 October	Argentina	1	Franco Buchanan	1	Maribel Aguirre
4–8 October	Argentina	2	Arián Etcheverry	2	Jennifer Francone
4–8 October	Argentina	3	Emiliano Fernández Abayay	3	Anabel Ruiz
13–15 October	Bulgaria	1	Nikolay Genov	1	Iveta Kostadinova
13–15 October	Bulgaria	2	Yordan Petrov	2	Ivana Tonkova
13–15 October	Bulgaria	3	Martin Papanov	3	Mihaela Grozdanova
20 October	Slovenia	1	Natan Gregorčič	1	
20 October	Slovenia	2	Andraž Skok	2	
20 October	Slovenia	3	Marko Pavlič	3	
29 November – 3 December	Venezuela	1	Franklin Chacón	1	
29 November – 3 December	Venezuela	2	Clever Martínez	2	
29 November – 3 December	Venezuela	3	Enmanuel David Viloria	3	
30 November – 4 December	India	1	Dinesh Kumar	1	Pooja Danole
30 November – 4 December	India	2	Manjeet Kumar	2	Meenakshi Rohilla
30 November – 4 December	India	3	Neeraj Kumar	3	Khoirom Rejiya Devi
8–10 December	Chile	1	Josafat Cárdenas	1	Aranza Villalón
8–10 December	Chile	2	Cristián Arriagada	2	Paula Villalón
8–10 December	Chile	3	Christopher Ponce Mejías	3	Victoria Martínez Retamal
10 December	Norway	1	Iver Knotten	1	Sonja Moi
10 December	Norway	2	Øystein Seth Fiskå	2	
10 December	Norway	3	Sondre Aarsbog Weiseth	3	
22 & 23 December	Belgium	1	Noah Vandenbranden	1	Marith Vanhove
22 & 23 December	Belgium	2	Lindsay De Vylder	2	Katrijn de Clercq
22 & 23 December	Belgium	3	Fabio Van den Bossche	3	Hélène Hesters
27 December	Netherlands	1	Brian Megens	1	Mischa Bredewold
27 December	Netherlands	2	Patrick Bos	2	Marjolein van 't Geloof
27 December	Netherlands	3	Cesar Beilo	3	Juliet Eickhof

=== Scratch ===
Date	Venue	Podium (Men)		Podium (Women)	
17–20 November 2022	Romania; Plovdiv (Bulgaria)	1	Daniel Crista	1	
17–20 November 2022	Romania; Plovdiv (Bulgaria)	2	Valentin Pleşea	2	
17–20 November 2022	Romania; Plovdiv (Bulgaria)	3	Emil Chepetan	3	
26 November 2022	Czech Republic; Prague	1	Jan Voneš	1	
26 November 2022	Czech Republic; Prague	2	Matyáš Koblížek	2	
26 November 2022	Czech Republic; Prague	3	Radovan Štec	3	
9–11 December 2022	Indonesia; Surakarta	1	Terry Yudha Kusuma	1	Ayustina Delia Priatna
9–11 December 2022	Indonesia; Surakarta	2	Yosandy Oetomo	2	Liontin Evangelina Setiawan
9–11 December 2022	Indonesia; Surakarta	3	Dealton Prayogo	3	Imelda Tabita Deswari Putri
9–11 December 2022	Norway; Sola	1	Anders Oddli	1	Anita Stenberg
9–11 December 2022	Norway; Sola	2	Emil Skår	2	Nora Tveit
9–11 December 2022	Norway; Sola	3	Sondre Weiseth	3	Pernille Feldmann
10–11 December 2022	Chile; Santiago	1	Matías Arriagada	1	Paola Muñoz
10–11 December 2022	Chile; Santiago	2	Manuel Lira	2	Scarlet Cortes
10–11 December 2022	Chile; Santiago	3	Christopher Ponce Mejías	3	Victoria Martínez Retamal
10–14 December 2022	India; Guwahati	1	Naykodi Krishna	1	
10–14 December 2022	India; Guwahati	2	Anandhu A	2	
10–14 December 2022	India; Guwahati	3	Sachin Desai	3	
27–29 December 2022	Netherlands; Apeldoorn	1	Matthijs Büchli	1	Lorena Wiebes
27–29 December 2022	Netherlands; Apeldoorn	2	Patrick Bos	2	Marjolein van 't Geloof
27–29 December 2022	Netherlands; Apeldoorn	3	Elmar Abma	3	Nina Kessler
6–8 January 2023	Canada; Milton	1	Dylan Bibic	1	Ariane Bonhomme
6–8 January 2023	Canada; Milton	2	Mathias Guillemette	2	Erin Attwell
6–8 January 2023	Canada; Milton	3	Michael Foley	3	Kiara Lylyk
14–15 January 2023	Portugal; Anadia	1	Iúri Leitão	1	Maria Martins
14–15 January 2023	Portugal; Anadia	2	Rodrigo Caixas	2	Daniela Campos
14–15 January 2023	Portugal; Anadia	3	João Matias	3	Beatriz Roxo
26–29 January 2023	United Kingdom; Newport	1	Joe Holt	1	Jessica Roberts
26–29 January 2023	United Kingdom; Newport	2	Matthew Brennan	2	Neah Evans
26–29 January 2023	United Kingdom; Newport	3	Jack Rootkin-Gray	3	Grace Lister
27 January 2023	Belgium; Ghent	1	Lindsay De Vylder	1	Marith Vanhove
27 January 2023	Belgium; Ghent	2	Jules Hesters	2	Lani Wittevrongel
27 January 2023	Belgium; Ghent	3	Tuur Dens	3	Silke D'Hont
8 February 2023	Mexico; Guadalajara	1	Ignacio Prado	1	Mariana Valadez
8 February 2023	Mexico; Guadalajara	2	Fernando Gabriel Nava Romo	2	Jessica Bonilla
8 February 2023	Mexico; Guadalajara	3	Ricardo Peña Salas	3	María Gaxiola
1–5 March 2023	New Zealand; Invercargill	1	Oliver Watson-Palmer	1	Amelia Sykes
1–5 March 2023	New Zealand; Invercargill	2	Hayden Strong	2	Belle Judd
1–5 March 2023	New Zealand; Invercargill	3	Hunter Gough	3	Samantha Walker
10 March 2023	Belarus; Minsk	1	Dzianis Mazur	1	Hanna Tserakh
10 March 2023	Belarus; Minsk	2	Raman Tsishkou	2	Karolina Biriuk
10 March 2023	Belarus; Minsk	3	Yauheni Karaliok	3	Taisiya Naskovich
10 March 2023	United Arab Emirates; Sharjah	1	Ahmed Al Mansoori	1	
10 March 2023	United Arab Emirates; Sharjah	2	Mohammed Youcef Al Mansoori	2	
10 March 2023	United Arab Emirates; Sharjah	3	Soudir Shir Mohamad Talal	3	
19 March 2023	Australia; Brisbane	1	John Carter	1	Chloe Moran
19 March 2023	Australia; Brisbane	2	Declan Trezise	2	Nicola Macdonald
19 March 2023	Australia; Brisbane	3	Rohan Haydon-Smith	3	Alexandra Martin-Wallace
22–24 March 2023	Israel; Tel Aviv	1	Rotem Tene	1	Ori Bash Dubinski
22–24 March 2023	Israel; Tel Aviv	2	Alon Yogev	2	Maayan Tzur
22–24 March 2023	Israel; Tel Aviv	3	Vladyslav Loginov	3	
1 April 2023 (Men's); 31 March 2023 (Women's)	Switzerland; Grenchen	1	Raphaël Clemencio	1	Aline Seitz
1 April 2023 (Men's); 31 March 2023 (Women's)	Switzerland; Grenchen	2	Valère Thiébaud	2	Lorena Leu
1 April 2023 (Men's); 31 March 2023 (Women's)	Switzerland; Grenchen	3	Dominik Bieler	3	Léna Mettraux
4 April	South Africa; Cape Town	1	Joshua van Wyk	1	S'Annara Grove
4 April	South Africa; Cape Town	2	David Maree	2	Danielle van Niekerk
4 April	South Africa; Cape Town	3	Carl Bonthuys	3	Ainsli de Beer
28–30 April	Bolivia; La Paz	1	Mateo Saravia Alanes	1	
28–30 April	Bolivia; La Paz	2	Joaquín Siles Cohello	2	
28–30 April	Bolivia; La Paz	3	Rubén Heraldo Montenegro	3	
5 May	Trinidad and Tobago; Couva	1	Akil Campbell	1	Cheyenne Awai
5 May	Trinidad and Tobago; Couva	2	Enrique De Comarmond	2	Adrianna Seyjagat
5 May	Trinidad and Tobago; Couva	3	Tariq Woods	3	Kanika Paul-Payne
5 May	Barbados; Couva (Trinidad & Tobago)	1	Edwin Sutherland	1	Amber Joseph
5 May	Barbados; Couva (Trinidad & Tobago)	2	Jamol Eastmond	2	
5 May	Barbados; Couva (Trinidad & Tobago)	3		3	
12–13 May	Japan; Shizuoka	1	Eiya Hashimoto	1	Yumi Kajihara
12–13 May	Japan; Shizuoka	2	Kazushige Kuboki	2	Maho Kakita
12–13 May	Japan; Shizuoka	3	Shunsuke Imamura	3	Tsuyaka Uchino
15–19 May	Malaysia; Nilai	1	Mior Muhammad Hazwan Hamzah	1	Nur Aisyah Mohamad Zubir
15–19 May	Malaysia; Nilai	2	Muhammad Yusri Shaari	2	Nur Fitrah Shaari
15–19 May	Malaysia; Nilai	3	Nur Aiman Rosli	3	Phi Kun Pan
19 May	Kazakhstan; Astana	1	Sergey Karmazhakov	1	Akpeiil Ossim
19 May	Kazakhstan; Astana	2	Ramis Dinmukhametov	2	Rinata Sultanova
19 May	Kazakhstan; Astana	3	Ilya Karabutov	3	Marina Kurnossova
19–20 May	Jamaica; Kingston	1	Andrew Ramsay	1	
19–20 May	Jamaica; Kingston	2	Jerome Forrest	2	
19–20 May	Jamaica; Kingston	3	Bradley McFarlane	3	
2 June	Ukraine; Lviv	1	Roman Gladysh	1	Tetyana Klymchenko
2 June	Ukraine; Lviv	2	Maksym Vasyliev	2	Anna Kolyzhuk
2 June	Ukraine; Lviv	3	Vladyslav Shcherban	3	Kateryna Velichko
9 June	Spain; Valencia	1	Albert Torres	1	Laura Rodríguez
9 June	Spain; Valencia	2	Sergi Amengual	2	Ziortza Isasi
9 June	Spain; Valencia	3	Xavier Cañellas	3	Tania Calvo
10–11 June	Slovakia; Prešov	1	Martin Chren	1	
10–11 June	Slovakia; Prešov	2	Pavol Rovder	2	
10–11 June	Slovakia; Prešov	3	Denis Hoza	3	
14–18 June	Germany; Cottbus	1	Moritz Augenstein	1	Hanna Dopjans
14–18 June	Germany; Cottbus	2	Benjamin Boos	2	Justyna Czapla
14–18 June	Germany; Cottbus	3	Calvin Dik	3	Fabienne Jährig
27 June	Denmark; Aarhus	1	Nicklas Amdi Pedersen	1	Ida Fialla
27 June	Denmark; Aarhus	2	Sebastian Juul	2	Anika Rasmussen
27 June	Denmark; Aarhus	3	Noah Wulff	3	Emma Hermansen
27–29 June	Italy; Fiorenzuola d'Arda	1	Michele Scartezzini	1	Martina Fidanza
27–29 June	Italy; Fiorenzuola d'Arda	2	Matteo Donegà	2	Martina Alzini
27–29 June	Italy; Fiorenzuola d'Arda	3	Davide Boscaro	3	Elena Bissolati
5–9 July	United States; Carson	1	Colby Lange	1	Jennifer Valente
5–9 July	United States; Carson	2	Grant Koontz	2	Colleen Gulick
5–9 July	United States; Carson	3	Anders Johnson	3	Hayley Bates
11–15 July	Iran; Tehran	1	Mohammad Ganjkhanlou	1	
11–15 July	Iran; Tehran	2	Behnam Ariyan	2	
11–15 July	Iran; Tehran	3	Mahdi Nateghi	3	
20–23 July	Colombia	1	Didier Chaparro	1	Juliana Londoño
20–23 July	Colombia	2	Juan Pablo Sossa	2	Karen Dahiana González
20–23 July	Colombia	3	Nicolás García Alvarez	3	Barbara Zapata
23–24 July	Chinese Taipei; Taichung	1	Feng Chun-kai	1	Ying Hsiu Lei
23–24 July	Chinese Taipei; Taichung	2	Chien Liang Chen	2	Chia Chi Lai
23–24 July	Chinese Taipei; Taichung	3	Shi Ru Xu	3	Ke Xin Zeng
27 July	Finland	1	Severi Savukoski	1	
27 July	Finland	2	Antti Träskelin	2	
27 July	Finland	3	Kalle Toivanen	3	
28–30 July	Greece; Athens	1	Zisis Soulios	1	Argiro Milaki
28–30 July	Greece; Athens	2	Georgios Boutopoulos	2	Rafaela Theano Dakou
28–30 July	Greece; Athens	3	Stefanos Klokas	3	Vasiliki Kokkali
6 August	El Salvador	1		1	
6 August	El Salvador	2		2	
6 August	El Salvador	3		3	
26–27 August	Ireland	1	Niall McLoughlin	1	Gabriella Homer
26–27 August	Ireland	2	Harvey Barnes	2	Aoife O'Brien
26–27 August	Ireland	3	Conn McDunphy	3	Annalise Murphy
15–17 September	Poland	1	Konrad Waliniak	1	Maja Tracka
15–17 September	Poland	2	Wojciech Pszczolarski	2	Wiktoria Pikulik
15–17 September	Poland	3	Aleksander Krukowski	3	Dorota Przęzak
15–17 September	Thailand	1	Patompob Phonarjthan	1	
15–17 September	Thailand	2	Janluang Jetsada	2	
15–17 September	Thailand	3	Sakchai Phodingam	3	
23 September	Czech Republic	1	Matyáš Koblížek	1	Petra Ševčíková
23 September	Czech Republic	2	Adam Křenek	2	Hana Heřmanovská
23 September	Czech Republic	3	Štěpán Široký	3	Kateřina Kohoutková
27–29 September 2023 (2023 Edition)	Romania; Plovdiv (Bulgaria)	1	Daniel Crista	1	Cătălina Cătineanu
27–29 September 2023 (2023 Edition)	Romania; Plovdiv (Bulgaria)	2	Valentin Pleșa	2	Georgeta Ungureanu
27–29 September 2023 (2023 Edition)	Romania; Plovdiv (Bulgaria)	3	Carol-Eduard Novak	3	Maria-Ecaterina Stancu
29 September – 8 October 2023	Costa Rica	1	Berny Sánchez	1	Valeria Badilla
29 September – 8 October 2023	Costa Rica	2	Jordan Rodríguez Arias	2	
29 September – 8 October 2023	Costa Rica	3	Jefry Jiménez	3	
4–8 October	Argentina	1	Tomás Ruiz	1	Maribel Aguirre
4–8 October	Argentina	2	Franco Buchanan	2	Ludmila Ángela Aguirre
4–8 October	Argentina	3	Lucas Gaday	3	Cristina Irma Greve
7–8 October	Austria	1	Tim Wafler	1	Leila Gschwentner
7–8 October	Austria	2	Maximilian Schmidbauer	2	Verena Eberhardt
7–8 October	Austria	3	Raphael Kokas	3	Anja Vogl
13–15 October	Bulgaria	1	Nikolay Genov	1	
13–15 October	Bulgaria	2	Martin Papanov	2	
13–15 October	Bulgaria	3	Yordan Petrov	3	
22 October	Slovenia	1	Tilen Finkšt	1	
22 October	Slovenia	2	Natan Gregorčič	2	
22 October	Slovenia	3	Jaka Špoljar	3	
10–11 November (Women's); 22–23 December (Men's)	Belgium	1	Jules Hesters	1	Lotte Kopecky
10–11 November (Women's); 22–23 December (Men's)	Belgium	2	Lindsay De Vylder	2	Katrijn De Clercq
10–11 November (Women's); 22–23 December (Men's)	Belgium	3	Tuur Dens	3	Lani Wittevrongel
29 November – 3 December	Venezuela	1	Clever Martínez	1	Wilmarys Pacheco
29 November – 3 December	Venezuela	2	Franklin Chacón	2	Valeria Alejandra Marchan
29 November – 3 December	Venezuela	3	Yoisnerth Rondon Albarran	3	
8–10 December	Chile	1	Felipe Pizarro	1	Aranza Villalón
8–10 December	Chile	2	Jacob Decar	2	Scarlet Cortés
8–10 December	Chile	3	Cristian Arriagada	3	Victoria Martínez Retamal
8–10 December	Indonesia	1	Terry Yudha Kusuma	1	Ayustina Delia Priatna
8–10 December	Indonesia	2	Bernard Van Aert	2	Farrenty Putri
8–10 December	Indonesia	3	Yosandy Darmawan Oetomo	3	Wiji Lestari
10 December	Norway	1	Sander Granberg	1	Anita Stenberg
10 December	Norway	2	Karsten Larsen Feldmann	2	Nora Tveit
10 December	Norway	3	Sondre Aarsbog Weiseth	3	
10 December	Sweden	1	Gustav Johansson	1	
10 December	Sweden	2	Neo Viking	2	
10 December	Sweden	3	Hugo Porath	3	
28 & 29 December	Netherlands	1	Yanne Dorenbos	1	Lorena Wiebes
28 & 29 December	Netherlands	2	Maikel Zijlaard	2	Nienke Veenhoven
28 & 29 December	Netherlands	3	Philip Heijnen	3	Marjolein van 't Geloof

=== Keirin ===
Date	Venue	Podium (Men)		Podium (Women)	
9–11 December 2022	Indonesia; Surakarta	1	Dika Alif	1	Ratu Afifah Nur Indah
9–11 December 2022	Indonesia; Surakarta	2	Reno Yudho	2	Wiji Lestari
9–11 December 2022	Indonesia; Surakarta	3	Joko Supriyanto	3	Farrenty Desfenta Putri
10–11 December 2022	Chile; Santiago	1	Joaquín Fuenzalida	1	Daniela Colilef
10–11 December 2022	Chile; Santiago	2	Patricio Cáceres Barrías	2	Paula Molina Rodríguez
10–11 December 2022	Chile; Santiago	3	Mariano Lecaros	3	Paulina Pontillo González
10–14 December 2022	India; Guwahati	1	Esow Alben	1	Mayuri Lute
10–14 December 2022	India; Guwahati	2	Ronaldo Laitonjam	2	Triyasha Paul
10–14 December 2022	India; Guwahati	3	Yanglem Rojit Singh	3	M Sonali Chanu
27–29 December 2022	Netherlands; Apeldoorn	1	Harrie Lavreysen	1	Steffie van der Peet
27–29 December 2022	Netherlands; Apeldoorn	2	Tijmen van Loon	2	Ruby Huisman
27–29 December 2022	Netherlands; Apeldoorn	3	Daan Kool	3	Lonneke Geraerts
2 January 2023 (Men); 29 January 2023 (Women)	Belgium; Ghent	1	Runar De Schrijver	1	Nicky Degrendele
2 January 2023 (Men); 29 January 2023 (Women)	Belgium; Ghent	2	Mathias Lefeber	2	Valerie Jenaer
2 January 2023 (Men); 29 January 2023 (Women)	Belgium; Ghent	3	Arne De Groote	3	Kjelle Poets
5 January 2023	France; Roubaix	1	Sébastien Vigier	1	Mathilde Gros
5 January 2023	France; Roubaix	2	Tom Derache	2	Taky Marie-Divine Kouamé
5 January 2023	France; Roubaix	3	Clément Cordenos	3	Julie Michaux
6–8 January 2023	Canada; Milton	1	James Hedgcock	1	Lauriane Genest
6–8 January 2023	Canada; Milton	2	Tyler Rorke	2	Sarah Orban
6–8 January 2023	Canada; Milton	3	Nick Wammes	3	Diane Snobelen
26–29 January 2023	United Kingdom; Newport	1	Hamish Turnbull	1	Emma Finucane
26–29 January 2023	United Kingdom; Newport	2	Jack Carlin	2	Katy Marchant
26–29 January 2023	United Kingdom; Newport	3	Niall Monks	3	Sophie Capewell
10 February 2023	Mexico; Guadalajara	1	Edgar Verdugo	1	Yuli Verdugo
10 February 2023	Mexico; Guadalajara	2	Juan Carlos Ruíz Terán	2	Jessica Salazar
10 February 2023	Mexico; Guadalajara	3	Jesús Daniel García Reyes	3	Daniela Gaxiola
1–5 March 2023	New Zealand; Invercargill	1	Callum Saunders	1	Shaane Fulton
1–5 March 2023	New Zealand; Invercargill	2	Patrick Clancy	2	Mya Anderson
1–5 March 2023	New Zealand; Invercargill	3	Kaio Lart	3	Nicole Marshall
8–12 March 2023	Brazil; Indaiatuba	1	João Vitor da Silva	1	Carolina Barbosa
8–12 March 2023	Brazil; Indaiatuba	2	Flávio Cipriano	2	Maria Tereza Müller
8–12 March 2023	Brazil; Indaiatuba	3	Daniel Gruer de Brito	3	Sumaia Ali Ribeiro
11 March 2023	Belarus; Minsk	1	Artem Zaitsev	1	Anastasia Kipitkova
11 March 2023	Belarus; Minsk	2	Aliaksandr Hlova	2	Alina Korotkina
11 March 2023	Belarus; Minsk	3	Artur Scherbakov	3	Varvara Bosyakova
17–19 March 2023	Ecuador; Quito	1	Francisco Nazareno	1	Ruth Rendon
17–19 March 2023	Ecuador; Quito	2	Steven Valencia	2	Génesis Tarira
17–19 March 2023	Ecuador; Quito	3	Jilmar Imbaquingo	3	Patricia Chala
18 March 2023	Australia; Brisbane	1	Matthew Richardson	1	Alessia McCaig
18 March 2023	Australia; Brisbane	2	Thomas Cornish	2	Selina Ho
18 March 2023	Australia; Brisbane	3	Daniel Barber	3	Breanna Hargrave
22–24 March 2023	Israel; Tel Aviv	1	Mikhail Iakovlev	1	
22–24 March 2023	Israel; Tel Aviv	2	Nevo Shuval	2	
22–24 March 2023	Israel; Tel Aviv	3	Jonathan Aloni	3	
4–5 April	South Africa; Cape Town	1	Jean Spies	1	S'Annara Grove
4–5 April	South Africa; Cape Town	2	Matthew Lester	2	Michaela Lubbe
4–5 April	South Africa; Cape Town	3	James Swart	3	Amber Hindmarch
8 April	Kazakhstan; Astana	1	Andrey Chugay	1	Akpeil Osim
8 April	Kazakhstan; Astana	2	Kirill Kurdidi	2	Yuliya Golubkova
8 April	Kazakhstan; Astana	3	Viktor Golov	3	Polina Bratchikova
28–30 April	Bolivia; La Paz	1	Mateo Saravia Alanes	1	
28–30 April	Bolivia; La Paz	2	Ruben Montenegro Saavedra	2	
28–30 April	Bolivia; La Paz	3	Marcelo Fabian Vilca Cata	3	
4–8 May	Trinidad and Tobago; Couva	1	Nicholas Paul	1	
4–8 May	Trinidad and Tobago; Couva	2	Kwesi Browne	2	
4–8 May	Trinidad and Tobago; Couva	3	Quincy Alexander	3	
13 May	Japan; Shizuoka	1	Kaiya Ota	1	Mina Sato
13 May	Japan; Shizuoka	2	Shinji Nakano	2	Riyu Ohta
13 May	Japan; Shizuoka	3	Kyohei Shinzan	3	Fuko Umekawa
15–19 May	Malaysia; Nilai	1	Azizulhasni Awang	1	Nurul Izzah Izzati Mohd Asri
15–19 May	Malaysia; Nilai	2	Fadhil Zonis	2	Anis Amira Rosidi
15–19 May	Malaysia; Nilai	3	Muhammad Ridwan Sahrom	3	Nurul Aliana Syafika Azizan
19–20 May	Jamaica; Kingston	1	Daniel Palmer	1	Dahlia Palmer
19–20 May	Jamaica; Kingston	2	Andrew Ramsay	2	
19–20 May	Jamaica; Kingston	3	Mavin Anderson	3	
3–4 June	Hungary; Budapest	1	Sándor Szalontay	1	
3–4 June	Hungary; Budapest	2	Patrik Rómeó Lovassy	2	
3–4 June	Hungary; Budapest	3	Bertold Drijver	3	
5 June	Ukraine; Lviv	1	Vladyslav Denysenko	1	Alla Biletska
5 June	Ukraine; Lviv	2	Bohdan Danylchuk	2	Sofiia Kovtun
5 June	Ukraine; Lviv	3	Yehor Korobov	3	Karolina Kelyukh
9–11 June	Spain; Valencia	1	Alejandro Martínez	1	Helena Casas
9–11 June	Spain; Valencia	2	Esteban Garmendia	2	Eva Anguela
9–11 June	Spain; Valencia	3	Llorenç Tomàs	3	Saioa Orgambide
14–18 June	Germany; Cottbus	1	Maximilian Dörnbach	1	Emma Hinze
14–18 June	Germany; Cottbus	2	Paul Groß	2	Sandra Hainzl
14–18 June	Germany; Cottbus	3	Anton Höhne	3	Katharina Paggel
27–29 June	Italy; Fiorenzuola d'Arda	1	Stefano Minuta	1	Miriam Vece
27–29 June	Italy; Fiorenzuola d'Arda	2	Daniele Napolitano	2	Elena Bissolati
27–29 June	Italy; Fiorenzuola d'Arda	3	Stefano Moro	3	Giada Capobianchi
30 June – 2 July	Czech Republic; Brno	1	Matěj Bohuslávek	1	Veronika Jaborníková
30 June – 2 July	Czech Republic; Brno	2	Martin Čechman	2	Anna Jaborníková
30 June – 2 July	Czech Republic; Brno	3	Dominik Topinka	3	Sára Peterková
1–5 July	South Korea; Yangyang County	1	Oh Je-seok	1	Lee Hye-jin
1–5 July	South Korea; Yangyang County	2	Choi Woo-rim	2	Kim Chae-yeon
1–5 July	South Korea; Yangyang County	3	Kim Cheng-su	3	Cho Sun-young
5–9 July	United States; Carson	1	Dalton Walters	1	Mandy Marquardt
5–9 July	United States; Carson	2	Geneway Tang	2	McKenna McKee
5–9 July	United States; Carson	3	Evan Boone	3	Kayla Hankins
11–15 July	Iran; Tehran	1	Mohammad Rahimabadi	1	
11–15 July	Iran; Tehran	2	Mohammad Daneshvar	2	
11–15 July	Iran; Tehran	3	Mohammad Ganjkhanlou	3	
20–23 July	Colombia; Medellín	1	Kevin Quintero	1	Martha Bayona
20–23 July	Colombia; Medellín	2	Fabián Puerta	2	Valeria Cardozo
20–23 July	Colombia; Medellín	3	Santiago Ramírez	3	Juliana Gaviria
23–24 July	Chinese Taipei; Taichung	1	Shih Feng Kang	1	Ching Yun Chen
23–24 July	Chinese Taipei; Taichung	2	Tsai Chia Hsun	2	Wang Tzu-chun
23–24 July	Chinese Taipei; Taichung	3	Shih Hsin Hsiao	3	Sin Ting Wang
28 July	Finland	1	Pauli Putkonen	1	Sini Savolainen
28 July	Finland	2	Mika Simola	2	Ida Sten
28 July	Finland	3	Seppo Laakso	3	Iisa Lepistö
28–30 July	Greece; Athens	1	Konstantinos Livanos	1	Argiro Milaki
28–30 July	Greece; Athens	2	Miltiadis Charovas	2	Despoina Tourli
28–30 July	Greece; Athens	3	Stamatios Savvakis	3	Konstantina Farfara
6 August	El Salvador	1		1	
6 August	El Salvador	2		2	
6 August	El Salvador	3		3	
26–27 August	Ireland	1	Eoin Mullen	1	Orla Walsh
26–27 August	Ireland	2	Cian Keogh	2	Deirbhle Ivory
26–27 August	Ireland	3	Callum O'Toole	3	Autumn Collins
15–17 September	Poland	1	Mateusz Rudyk	1	Paulina Petri
15–17 September	Poland	2	Patryk Rajkowski	2	Nikola Seremak
15–17 September	Poland	3	Daniel Rochna	3	Marlena Karwacka
15–17 September	Thailand	1	Pongthep Tapimay	1	
15–17 September	Thailand	2	Nitirut Kitphiriyakan	2	
15–17 September	Thailand	3	Petcharat Yeaunyong	3	
4–8 October	Argentina	1	Lucas Vilar	1	Natalia Vera
4–8 October	Argentina	2	Leandro Bottasso	2	Brenda Ximena Gómez
4–8 October	Argentina	3	Juan Bautista Rodríguez	3	Milagros Sanabria
13–15 October	Bulgaria	1	Miroslav Minchev	1	
13–15 October	Bulgaria	2	Georgi Lumparov	2	
13–15 October	Bulgaria	3	Vasil Popov	3	
30 November – 4 December	India	1	Yanglem Rojit Singh	1	Triyasha Paul
30 November – 4 December	India	2	David Elkathchoongo	2	Mayuri Dhanraj Lute
30 November – 4 December	India	3	Mayur Pawar	3	Celestina Chelobroy
8–10 December	Chile	1	Joaquín Fuenzalida Galaz	1	Paula Molina Rodríguez
8–10 December	Chile	2	Mariano Lecaros Toro	2	Victoria Huenchumil Rain
8–10 December	Chile	3	Diego Fuenzalida Galaz	3	
8–10 December	Indonesia	1		1	Wiji Lestari
8–10 December	Indonesia	2		2	Afifah Nur Indah
8–10 December	Indonesia	3		3	Ayustina Delia Priatna
26–30 December	Belgium	1	Runar De Schrijver	1	Nicky Degrendele
26–30 December	Belgium	2	Tjorven Mertens	2	Valerie Jenaer
26–30 December	Belgium	3	Gerald Nys	3	Kjelle Poets
27 & 29 December	Netherlands	1	Harrie Lavreysen	1	Lonneke Geraerts
27 & 29 December	Netherlands	2	Jeffrey Hoogland	2	Kimberly Kalee
27 & 29 December	Netherlands	3	Daan Kool	3	Ruby Huisman

=== Sprint ===
Date	Venue	Podium (Men)		Podium (Women)	
17–20 November 2022	Romania; Plovdiv (Bulgaria)	1	Daniel Crista	1	
17–20 November 2022	Romania; Plovdiv (Bulgaria)	2	Valentin Plesea	2	
17–20 November 2022	Romania; Plovdiv (Bulgaria)	3	Emil Chepetan	3	
9–11 December 2022	Indonesia; Surakarta	1	Dika Alif	1	Wiji Lestari
9–11 December 2022	Indonesia; Surakarta	2	Reno Yudho	2	Ratu Afifah
9–11 December 2022	Indonesia; Surakarta	3	Pugun Ahmadi	3	Imelda Tabita
9–11 December 2022	Norway; Sola	1	Sebastian Kartfjord	1	Anita Stenberg
9–11 December 2022	Norway; Sola	2	Frode Svortevik Birkeland	2	Nora Tveit
9–11 December 2022	Norway; Sola	3	Aasmund Groven Lindtveit	3	Pernille Feldmann
10–11 December 2022	Chile; Santiago	1	Joaquín Fuenzalida	1	Daniela Colilef
10–11 December 2022	Chile; Santiago	2	Carlos Rodríguez	2	Paula Molina Rodríguez
10–11 December 2022	Chile; Santiago	3	Vicente Ramírez Gómez	3	Martina Rojas
10–11 December 2022	Sweden; Falun	1	Christoffer Eriksson	1	
10–11 December 2022	Sweden; Falun	2	Jonas Månsson	2	
10–11 December 2022	Sweden; Falun	3	Fabian Birgersson	3	
10–14 December 2022	India; Guwahati	1	Esow Alben	1	Triyasha Paul
10–14 December 2022	India; Guwahati	2	David Beckham Elkathchoongo	2	Mayuri Lute
10–14 December 2022	India; Guwahati	3	Ronaldo Laitonjam	3	Alena Reji
27–29 December 2022	Netherlands; Apeldoorn	1	Harrie Lavreysen	1	Steffie van der Peet
27–29 December 2022	Netherlands; Apeldoorn	2	Tijmen van Loon	2	Kimberly Kalee
27–29 December 2022	Netherlands; Apeldoorn	3	Daan Kool	3	Ruby Huisman
30 December 2022 (Men's); 28 January 2023 (Women's)	Belgium; Ghent	1	Runar De Schrijver	1	Nicky Degrendele
30 December 2022 (Men's); 28 January 2023 (Women's)	Belgium; Ghent	2	Tuur Dens	2	Valerie Jenaer
30 December 2022 (Men's); 28 January 2023 (Women's)	Belgium; Ghent	3	Gerald Nys	3	Julie Nicolaes
28–31 December 2022	China; Changxing County	1	Chenxi Xue	1	Bao Shanju
28–31 December 2022	China; Changxing County	2	Weiming Yan	2	Chen Feifei
28–31 December 2022	China; Changxing County	3	Zhiwei Li	3	Zhai Fei
5 January 2023	France; Roubaix	1	Rayan Helal	1	Mathilde Gros
5 January 2023	France; Roubaix	2	Sébastien Vigier	2	Taky Marie-Divine Kouamé
5 January 2023	France; Roubaix	3	Tom Derache	3	Julie Michaux
6–8 January 2023	Canada; Milton	1	James Hedgcock	1	Lauriane Genest
6–8 January 2023	Canada; Milton	2	Nick Wammes	2	Kelsey Mitchell
6–8 January 2023	Canada; Milton	3	Tyler Rorke	3	Sarah Orban
26–29 January 2023	United Kingdom; Newport	1	Harry Ledingham-Horn	1	Emma Finucane
26–29 January 2023	United Kingdom; Newport	2	Jack Carlin	2	Sophie Capewell
26–29 January 2023	United Kingdom; Newport	3	Matt Rotherham	3	Lauren Bell
8 February 2023	Mexico; Guadalajara	1	Juan Carlos Ruíz Terán	1	Jessica Salazar
8 February 2023	Mexico; Guadalajara	2	Edgar Verdugo	2	Yuli Verdugo
8 February 2023	Mexico; Guadalajara	3	Emmanuel Jafet López	3	Daniela Gaxiola
1–5 March 2023	New Zealand; Invercargill	1	Callum Saunders	1	Shaane Fulton
1–5 March 2023	New Zealand; Invercargill	2	Patrick Clancy	2	Nicole Marshall
1–5 March 2023	New Zealand; Invercargill	3	Reuben Webster	3	Sophie de Vries
8–12 March 2023	Brazil; Indaiatuba	1	João Vitor Silva	1	Carolina Barbosa
8–12 March 2023	Brazil; Indaiatuba	2	Flávio Cipriano	2	Tatielle Valadares
8–12 March 2023	Brazil; Indaiatuba	3	Daniel Henrique Gruer de Brito	3	Maria Tereza Müller
10 March 2023	Belarus; Minsk	1	Artem Zaitsev	1	Varvara Bosyakova
10 March 2023	Belarus; Minsk	2	Aliaksandr Hlova	2	Yulia Manets
10 March 2023	Belarus; Minsk	3	Artur Scherbakov	3	Arina Staravoitava
16 March 2023	Australia; Brisbane	1	Matthew Richardson	1	Kristina Clonan
16 March 2023	Australia; Brisbane	2	Thomas Cornish	2	Alessia McCaig
16 March 2023	Australia; Brisbane	3	James Brister	3	Breanna Hargrave
17–19 March 2023	Ecuador; Quito	1	Alan Albán	1	Génesis Tarira
17–19 March 2023	Ecuador; Quito	2	Francisco Nazareno	2	Ruth Perdomo
17–19 March 2023	Ecuador; Quito	3	Kevin Canchingre	3	Patricia Chala
22–24 March 2023	Israel; Tel Aviv	1	Mikhail Iakovlev	1	
22–24 March 2023	Israel; Tel Aviv	2		2	
22–24 March 2023	Israel; Tel Aviv	3		3	
3 April	South Africa; Cape Town	1	Jean Spies	1	Michaela Lubbe
3 April	South Africa; Cape Town	2	Mitchell Sparrow	2	Odette Remus
3 April	South Africa; Cape Town	3	Johannes Wikus	3	Sunique van der Walt
8–12 April	Kazakhstan; Astana	1	Dmitriy Rezanov	1	Yuliya Golubkova
8–12 April	Kazakhstan; Astana	2	Andrey Chugay	2	Polina Bratchikova
8–12 April	Kazakhstan; Astana	3	Sergey Ponomaryov	3	Veronika Myrxina
28–30 April	Bolivia; La Paz	1	Sebastián Mena	1	Elizabeth Vásquez Avila
28–30 April	Bolivia; La Paz	2	José Manuel Aramayo	2	Kenia Karina Almanza Choré
28–30 April	Bolivia; La Paz	3	Mateo Saravia Alanes	3	Brenda Saavedra Zurita
4–8 May	Trinidad and Tobago; Couva	1	Nicholas Paul	1	Adrianna Seyjagat
4–8 May	Trinidad and Tobago; Couva	2	Kwesi Browne	2	Kanika Paul-Payne
4–8 May	Trinidad and Tobago; Couva	3	Quincy Alexander	3	
12 May	Japan; Shizuoka	1	Kaiya Ota	1	Mina Sato
12 May	Japan; Shizuoka	2	Shinji Nakano	2	Riyu Ohta
12 May	Japan; Shizuoka	3	Kohei Terasaki	3	Fuko Umekawa
13 May	Guatemala; Guatemala City	1	Luis Cordón	1	
13 May	Guatemala; Guatemala City	2	Rodolfo Sáenz	2	
13 May	Guatemala; Guatemala City	3	Brandon Pineda	3	
15–19 May	Malaysia; Nilai	1	Azizulhasni Awang	1	Nurul Izzah Izzati Mohd Asri
15–19 May	Malaysia; Nilai	2	Muhammad Shah Firdaus Sahrom	2	Anis Amira Rosidi
15–19 May	Malaysia; Nilai	3	Muhammad Ridwan	3	Nurul Aliana Syafika Azizan
19–20 May	Jamaica; Kingston	1	Daniel Palmer	1	Dahlia Palmer
19–20 May	Jamaica; Kingston	2	Demar Golding	2	
19–20 May	Jamaica; Kingston	3	Andrew Ramsay	3	
3–4 June	Hungary; Budapest	1	Sándor Szalontay	1	
3–4 June	Hungary; Budapest	2	Patrik Rómeó Lovassy	2	
3–4 June	Hungary; Budapest	3	Péter Müller	3	
9 June	Spain; Valencia	1	José Moreno Sánchez	1	Helena Casas
9 June	Spain; Valencia	2	Alejandro Martínez	2	Saioa Orgambide
9 June	Spain; Valencia	3	Ekain Jiménez	3	Lucía García
14–18 June	Germany; Cottbus	1	Maximilian Dörnbach	1	Emma Hinze
14–18 June	Germany; Cottbus	2	Marc Jurczyk	2	Lea Friedrich
14–18 June	Germany; Cottbus	3	Nik Schröter	3	Sandra Hainzl
17 June	Croatia; Zagreb	1	Lorenzo Marenzi	1	
17 June	Croatia; Zagreb	2	Matija Beđić	2	
17 June	Croatia; Zagreb	3	Vilim Čerić	3	
27–29 June	Italy; Fiorenzuola d'Arda	1		1	Miriam Vece
27–29 June	Italy; Fiorenzuola d'Arda	2		2	Elena Bissolati
27–29 June	Italy; Fiorenzuola d'Arda	3		3	Giada Capobianchi
30 June – 2 July	Czech Republic; Brno	1	Matěj Bohuslávek	1	Veronika Jaborníková
30 June – 2 July	Czech Republic; Brno	2	Dominik Topinka	2	Anna Jaborníková
30 June – 2 July	Czech Republic; Brno	3	Jakub Šťastný	3	Sára Peterková
1–5 July	South Korea; Yangyang County	1	Kang Seo-jun	1	Lee Hye-jin
1–5 July	South Korea; Yangyang County	2	Jung Ho-jin	2	Hwang Hyeon-seo
1–5 July	South Korea; Yangyang County	3	Lee Geon-min	3	Kim Ha-eun
5–9 July	United States; Carson	1	Jamie Alvord	1	McKenna McKee
5–9 July	United States; Carson	2	Evan Boone	2	Mandy Marquardt
5–9 July	United States; Carson	3	Geneway Tang	3	Keely Ainslie
11–15 July	Iran; Tehran	1	Mohammad Rahimabadi	1	
11–15 July	Iran; Tehran	2	Sina Gholami	2	
11–15 July	Iran; Tehran	3	Kasra Bagher Pour	3	
14–15 July	Peru; Lima	1	Francis Cachique	1	Alejandra Huamaní
14–15 July	Peru; Lima	2	Maximiliano Coila	2	Bethzabé Coila
14–15 July	Peru; Lima	3	Yoel Gallo	3	Madeleyne Gálvez
20–23 July	Colombia	1	Kevin Quintero	1	Martha Bayona
20–23 July	Colombia	2	Cristian Ortega	2	Valeria Cardozo
20–23 July	Colombia	3	Santiago Ramírez	3	Marianis Salazar
23–24 July	Chinese Taipei; Taichung	1	Shih Feng Kang	1	Ching Yun Chen
23–24 July	Chinese Taipei; Taichung	2	Sheng Kai Yang	2	Wang Tzu Chun
23–24 July	Chinese Taipei; Taichung	3	Tsai Chia Hsun	3	Sin Ting Wang
28–30 July	Greece; Athens	1	Konstantinos Livanos	1	Argiro Milaki
28–30 July	Greece; Athens	2	Ioannis Kalogeropoulos	2	Ioanna Plega-Gavrilaki
28–30 July	Greece; Athens	3	Miltiadis Charovas	3	Despina Tourli
30 July	Finland	1	Wille Riihelä	1	Sini Savolainen
30 July	Finland	2	Pauli Putkonen	2	Iisa Lepistö
30 July	Finland	3	Mika Simola	3	Jaana Hyvärinen
6 August	El Salvador	1		1	
6 August	El Salvador	2		2	
6 August	El Salvador	3		3	
26–27 August	Ireland	1	Eoin Mullen	1	Orla Walsh
26–27 August	Ireland	2	Cian Keogh	2	Deirbhle Ivory
26–27 August	Ireland	3	Alexander Abdul-Wahab	3	Ellen Ni Cleirigh
15–17 September	Poland	1	Mateusz Rudyk	1	Paulina Petri
15–17 September	Poland	2	Patryk Rajkowski	2	Marlena Karwacka
15–17 September	Poland	3	Rafał Sarnecki	3	Natalia Walecka
29 September – 8 October 2023	Costa Rica	1	Nayib Leandro Madrigal	1	Valeria Badilla
29 September – 8 October 2023	Costa Rica	2	Brayan Hernández	2	María Quezada
29 September – 8 October 2023	Costa Rica	3	Anthony Leonardo Vargas	3	
4–8 October	Argentina	1		1	Natalia Vera
4–8 October	Argentina	2		2	Valentina Luna
4–8 October	Argentina	3		3	Valentina Méndez
13–15 October	Bulgaria	1	Miroslav Minchev	1	
13–15 October	Bulgaria	2	Vasil Popov	2	
13–15 October	Bulgaria	3	Georgi Lumparov	3	
22 October	Slovenia	1	Eduard Žalar	1	
22 October	Slovenia	2	Mark Poberaj	2	
22 October	Slovenia	3	Bine Miškulin	3	
29 November – 3 December	Venezuela	1	Luis Yáñez	1	Jalymar Rodríguez
29 November – 3 December	Venezuela	2	Camilo Cesar Meza	2	Yoheris Peralta
29 November – 3 December	Venezuela	3	Amaro Andres Gomez	3	Valeria Alejandra Marchan
30 November – 4 December	India	1	Ronaldo Laitonjam	1	Triyasha Paul
30 November – 4 December	India	2	Esow Alben	2	Mayuri Dhanraj Lute
30 November – 4 December	India	3	David Elkatohchoongo	3	Celestina Chelobroy
8–10 December	Chile	1	Joaquín Fuenzalida Galaz	1	Victoria Huenchumil Rain
8–10 December	Chile	2	Diego Fuenzalida Galaz	2	Paula Molina Rodríguez
8–10 December	Chile	3	Mauricio Molina	3	
8–10 December	Denmark	1	Jens Dich	1	
8–10 December	Denmark	2	Bo Sommer	2	
8–10 December	Denmark	3	Peter Jørgensen	3	
8–10 December	Indonesia	1	Dhentaka Dika Alif	1	Wiji Lestari
8–10 December	Indonesia	2	Mochamad Bintang Syawal	2	Afifah Nur Indah
8–10 December	Indonesia	3	Fandi Jolata	3	Imelda Tabita Deswari Putri
10 December	Norway	1	Tim Edvard Pettersen	1	Sonja Moi
10 December	Norway	2	Sebastian Kartfjord	2	Nora Tveit
10 December	Norway	3	Aasmund Groven Lindtveit	3	Pernille Feldmann
22 & 23 December	Belgium	1	Runar De Schrijver	1	Nicky Degrendele
22 & 23 December	Belgium	2	Tjorven Mertens	2	Julie Nicolaes
22 & 23 December	Belgium	3	Mathias Lefeber	3	Valerie Jenaer

=== Tempo Race ===
Date	Venue	Podium (Men)		Podium (Women)	
17–20 November 2022	Romania; Plovdiv (Bulgaria)	1	Daniel Crista	1	Noelle Priscilla Darabant Hușanu
17–20 November 2022	Romania; Plovdiv (Bulgaria)	2	Valentin Pleșea	2	
17–20 November 2022	Romania; Plovdiv (Bulgaria)	3	George Porumb	3	
26 November 2022	Czech Republic; Prague	1	Adam Křenek	1	
26 November 2022	Czech Republic; Prague	2	Matyáš Koblížek	2	
26 November 2022	Czech Republic; Prague	3	Jan Voneš	3	
9–11 December 2022	Norway; Sola	1	Iver Knotten	1	Anita Stenberg
9–11 December 2022	Norway; Sola	2	Sondre Weiseth	2	Nora Tveit
9–11 December 2022	Norway; Sola	3	Anders Oddli	3	
16–18 December 2022	New Zealand; Cambridge	1	George Jackson	1	Ally Wollaston
16–18 December 2022	New Zealand; Cambridge	2	Nick Kergozou	2	Bryony Botha
16–18 December 2022	New Zealand; Cambridge	3	Campbell Stewart	3	Ella Wyllie

=== Points Race ===
Date	Venue	Podium (Men)		Podium (Women)	
17–20 November 2022	Romania; Plovdiv (Bulgaria)	1	Daniel Crista	1	
17–20 November 2022	Romania; Plovdiv (Bulgaria)	2	Valentin Pleșea	2	
17–20 November 2022	Romania; Plovdiv (Bulgaria)	3	Sebastian Mihai Paveliu	3	
27 November 2022	Czech Republic; Prague	1	Milan Kadlec	1	
27 November 2022	Czech Republic; Prague	2	Radovan Štec	2	
27 November 2022	Czech Republic; Prague	3	Adam Křenek	3	
9–11 December 2022	Norway; Sola	1	Iver Knotten	1	Anita Stenberg
9–11 December 2022	Norway; Sola	2	Vetle Torin Eskedal	2	Nora Tveit
9–11 December 2022	Norway; Sola	3	Fredrik Nordahl Fløisvik	3	
10–11 December 2022	Chile; Santiago	1	Diego Ferreyra	1	
10–11 December 2022	Chile; Santiago	2	Nicolas Ignacio Vergara	2	
10–11 December 2022	Chile; Santiago	3	Nicolás Chacón	3	
10–11 December 2022	Sweden; Falun	1	Gustav Johansson	1	
10–11 December 2022	Sweden; Falun	2	Jonas Månsson	2	
10–11 December 2022	Sweden; Falun	3	David Eriksson	3	
27–29 December 2022	Netherlands; Apeldoorn	1	Philip Heijnen	1	Marit Raaijmakers
27–29 December 2022	Netherlands; Apeldoorn	2	Justus Willemsen	2	Lonneke Uneken
27–29 December 2022	Netherlands; Apeldoorn	3	Yanne Dorenbos	3	Marjolein van 't Geloof
2 January 2023	Belgium; Ghent	1	Brent Van Mulders	1	Lotte Kopecky
2 January 2023	Belgium; Ghent	2	Lindsay De Vylder	2	Hélène Hesters
2 January 2023	Belgium; Ghent	3	Arthur Senrame	3	Lani Wittevrongel
5 January 2023	France; Roubaix	1	Benjamin Thomas	1	Victoire Berteau
5 January 2023	France; Roubaix	2	Thomas Boudat	2	Jade Labastugue
5 January 2023	France; Roubaix	3	Donavan Grondin	3	Valentine Fortin
26–29 January 2023	United Kingdom; Newport	1	William Perrett	1	Neah Evans
26–29 January 2023	United Kingdom; Newport	2	William Tidball	2	Maddie Leech
26–29 January 2023	United Kingdom; Newport	3	Josh Charlton	3	Sophie Lewis
9 February 2023	Mexico; Guadalajara	1	Tomas Aguirre	1	Yareli Acevedo
9 February 2023	Mexico; Guadalajara	2	Ulises Alfredo Castillo	2	Jessica Bonilla
9 February 2023	Mexico; Guadalajara	3	Christopher Torres	3	Natalia Rodríguez
1–5 March 2023	New Zealand; Invercargill	1	Hayden Strong	1	Amelia Sykes
1–5 March 2023	New Zealand; Invercargill	2	Hunter Gough	2	Samantha Walker
1–5 March 2023	New Zealand; Invercargill	3	Oliver Watson-Palmer	3	Belle Judd
10 March 2023	United Arab Emirates; Sharjah	1	Ahmed Al Mansoori	1	
10 March 2023	United Arab Emirates; Sharjah	2	Mohammed Youcef Al Mansoori	2	
10 March 2023	United Arab Emirates; Sharjah	3	Omar Al Mashghouni	3	
11 March 2023	Belarus; Minsk	1	Yauheni Karaliok	1	Anastasia Kipitkova
11 March 2023	Belarus; Minsk	2	Raman Ramanau	2	Irina Chuyankova
11 March 2023	Belarus; Minsk	3	Dzianis Mazur	3	Hanna Vasilkova
17–19 March 2023	Ecuador; Quito	1	Sebastián Novoa	1	
17–19 March 2023	Ecuador; Quito	2	Efrain Quishpe	2	
17–19 March 2023	Ecuador; Quito	3	Erik Daniel Caiza	3	
18 March 2023	Australia; Brisbane	1	Tyler Tomkinson	1	Chloe Moran
18 March 2023	Australia; Brisbane	2	John Carter	2	Isabelle Carnes
18 March 2023	Australia; Brisbane	3	Oliver Bleddyn	3	Sophie Marr
22–24 March 2023	Israel; Tel Aviv	1	Amit Keinan	1	Maayan Tzur
22–24 March 2023	Israel; Tel Aviv	2	Guy Timor	2	
22–24 March 2023	Israel; Tel Aviv	3	Vladyslav Loginov	3	
30 March 2023 (Women's); 1 April (Men's)	Switzerland; Grenchen	1	Lukas Rüegg	1	Fabienne Buri
30 March 2023 (Women's); 1 April (Men's)	Switzerland; Grenchen	2	Noah Bögli	2	Aline Seitz
30 March 2023 (Women's); 1 April (Men's)	Switzerland; Grenchen	3	Claudio Imhof	3	Léna Mettraux
2 April	South Africa; Cape Town	1	Joshua van Wyk	1	S'Annara Grove
2 April	South Africa; Cape Town	2	Joshua Dike	2	Danielle Van Niekerk
2 April	South Africa; Cape Town	3	David Maree	3	Ainsli De Beer
4–8 April	Uzbekistan; Namangan	1	Davirjan Abdurakhmanov	1	Olga Zabelinskaya
4–8 April	Uzbekistan; Namangan	2	Sanjarbek Ergashev	1	Yanina Kuskova
4–8 April	Uzbekistan; Namangan	3	Farrukh Bobosherov	2	Asal Rizaeva
28–30 April	Bolivia; La Paz	1	Franz Vicmar Portuguez Cotari	1	
28–30 April	Bolivia; La Paz	2	Alejandro Luna	2	
28–30 April	Bolivia; La Paz	3	Mateo Saravia Alanes	3	
14 May	Japan; Shizuoka	1	Naoki Kojima	1	Yumi Kajihara
14 May	Japan; Shizuoka	2	Shoi Matsuda	2	Maho Kakita
14 May	Japan; Shizuoka	3	Eiya Hashimoto	3	Mizuki Ikeda
15–19 May	Malaysia; Nilai	1	Ariff Danial Noor Roseidi	1	Nur Aisyah Mohamad Zubir
15–19 May	Malaysia; Nilai	2	Muhammad Yusri Shaari	2	Phi Kun Pan
15–19 May	Malaysia; Nilai	3	Nur Aiman Rosli	3	Nyo Ci Hui
22 May	Kazakhstan; Astana	1	Artyom Zakharov	1	Rinata Sultanova
22 May	Kazakhstan; Astana	2	Ramis Dinmukhametov	2	Akpeiil Ossim
22 May	Kazakhstan; Astana	3	Assylkhan Turar	3	Faina Potapova
3–4 June	Hungary; Budapest	1	Bertold Drijver	1	
3–4 June	Hungary; Budapest	2	Viktor Filutás	2	
3–4 June	Hungary; Budapest	3	Marcell Imre Fehérvári	3	
4 June	Ukraine; Lviv	1	Vitaliy Hryniv	1	Anna Kolyzhuk
4 June	Ukraine; Lviv	2	Maksym Vasilyev	2	Iryna Shymanska
4 June	Ukraine; Lviv	3	Yaroslav Kozakov	3	Maryna Ivaniuk
9–11 June	Spain; Valencia	1	Albert Torres	1	Ziortza Isasi
9–11 June	Spain; Valencia	2	Xavier Cañellas	2	Isabel Ferreres
9–11 June	Spain; Valencia	3	Eloy Teruel	3	Marina Garau
10–11 June	Slovakia; Prešov	1	Martin Chren	1	
10–11 June	Slovakia; Prešov	2	Pavol Rovder	2	
10–11 June	Slovakia; Prešov	3	Denis Hoza	3	
14–18 June	Germany; Cottbus	1	Moritz Augenstein	1	Lea Lin Teutenberg
14–18 June	Germany; Cottbus	2	Roger Kluge	2	Franziska Brauße
14–18 June	Germany; Cottbus	3	Max Kanter	3	Lena Charlotte Reißner
17 June	Croatia; Zagreb	1	Lorenzo Marenzi	1	
17 June	Croatia; Zagreb	2	Matija Beđić	2	
17 June	Croatia; Zagreb	3	Ivan Greiner	3	
27 June	Denmark; Aarhus	1	Nicklas Amdi Pedersen	1	Ida Fialla
27 June	Denmark; Aarhus	2	Nils Lau Nyborg Broge	2	Anika Rasmussen
27 June	Denmark; Aarhus	3	Sebastian Juul	3	Emma Hermansen
27–29 June	Italy; Fiorenzuola d'Arda	1	Elia Viviani	1	Martina Alzini
27–29 June	Italy; Fiorenzuola d'Arda	2	Matteo Donegà	2	Elena Cecchini
27–29 June	Italy; Fiorenzuola d'Arda	3	Niccolò Galli	3	Lara Crestanello
5–9 July	United States; Carson	1	Colby Lange	1	Jennifer Valente
5–9 July	United States; Carson	2	Eddy Huntsman	2	Chloe Patrick
5–9 July	United States; Carson	3	Viggo Moore	3	Danielle Morshead
11–15 July	Iran; Tehran	1	Mohammad Ganjkhanlou	1	
11–15 July	Iran; Tehran	2	Behnam Ariyan	2	
11–15 July	Iran; Tehran	3	Mehdi Sohrabi	3	
20–23 July	Colombia	1	Anderson Arboleda	1	Jessenia Meneses
20–23 July	Colombia	2	Kevin David Castillo	2	Elizabeth Castaño
20–23 July	Colombia	3	Santiago Isaac Cadavid	3	Lina Rojas
28 July	Finland	1	Severi Savukoski	1	Ida Sten
28 July	Finland	2	Kalle Toivanen	2	
28 July	Finland	3	Ivar Källberg	3	
28–30 July	Greece; Athens	1	Georgios Boutopoulos	1	Argiro Milaki
28–30 July	Greece; Athens	2	Nikolaos Michail Drakos	2	Glykeria Angelaki
28–30 July	Greece; Athens	3	Polychronis Tzortzakis	3	Eleni Kokoliou
15–17 September	Poland	1	Konrad Waliniak	1	Wiktoria Pikulik
15–17 September	Poland	2	Wojciech Pszczolarski	2	Nikol Płosaj
15–17 September	Poland	3	Damian Sławek	3	Patrycja Lorkowska
15–17 September	Thailand	1	Setthawut Yordsuwan	1	
15–17 September	Thailand	2	Kittidet Chaimusik	2	
15–17 September	Thailand	3	Peerapong Ladngern	3	
23 September	Czech Republic	1	Adam Křenek	1	
23 September	Czech Republic	2	Ondřej Pokorný	2	
23 September	Czech Republic	3	Viktor Padělek	3	
27–29 September 2023 (2023 Edition)	Romania; Plovdiv (Bulgaria)	1		1	Cătălina Cătineanu
27–29 September 2023 (2023 Edition)	Romania; Plovdiv (Bulgaria)	2		2	Georgeta Ungureanu
27–29 September 2023 (2023 Edition)	Romania; Plovdiv (Bulgaria)	3		3	Iuliana Cioclu
29 September – 8 October 2023	Costa Rica	1	Jordan Rodríguez Arias	1	
29 September – 8 October 2023	Costa Rica	2	Jefry Jiménez	2	
29 September – 8 October 2023	Costa Rica	3	Berny Sánchez	3	
4–8 October	Argentina	1	Leonardo Cobarrubia	1	Ludmila Ángela Aguirre
4–8 October	Argentina	2	Gerardo Tivani	2	Maribel Aguirre
4–8 October	Argentina	3	Omar Azzem	3	Julieta Benedetti
7–8 October	Austria	1	Maximilian Schmidbauer	1	Leila Gschwentner
7–8 October	Austria	2	Tim Wafler	2	Verena Eberhardt
7–8 October	Austria	3	Raphael Kokas	3	Anja Vogl
13–15 October	Bulgaria	1	Martin Popov	1	
13–15 October	Bulgaria	2	Nikolay Genov	2	
13–15 October	Bulgaria	3	Martin Papanov	3	
21 October	Slovenia	1	Marko Pavlič	1	
21 October	Slovenia	2	Grega Podlesnik	2	
21 October	Slovenia	3	Natan Gregorčič	3	
8–10 December	Chile	1	Diego Ferreyra	1	
8–10 December	Chile	2	Sebastián Reyes Jofré	2	
8–10 December	Chile	3	Tomás Quiroz Martínez	3	
9–11 December	Czech Republic	1		1	Jarmila Machačová
9–11 December	Czech Republic	2		2	Petra Ševčíková
9–11 December	Czech Republic	3		3	Kateřina Kohoutková
10–11 November	Belgium	1	Lindsay De Vylder	1	Lotte Kopecky
10–11 November	Belgium	2	Robbe Ghys	2	Lani Wittevrongel
10–11 November	Belgium	3	Fabio Van den Bossche	3	Marith Vanhove
10 December	Norway	1	Kristoffer Forus	1	Anita Stenberg
10 December	Norway	2	Iver Knotten	2	Nora Tveit
10 December	Norway	3	Simen Evertsen-Hegreberg	3	
10 December	Sweden	1	Gustav Johansson	1	Anita Stenberg
10 December	Sweden	2	Hugo Porath	2	Nora Tveit
10 December	Sweden	3	David Eriksson	3	
28 & 29 December	Netherlands	1	Philip Heijnen	1	Marit Raaijmakers
28 & 29 December	Netherlands	2	Elmar Abma	2	Juliet Eickhof
28 & 29 December	Netherlands	3	Cees Bol	3	Lorena Wiebes

=== Time Trial ===
Date	Venue	Podium (Men)		Podium (Women)	
17–20 November 2022	Romania; Plovdiv (Bulgaria)	1	Daniel Crista	1	Noelle Priscilla Darabant-Hușanu
17–20 November 2022	Romania; Plovdiv (Bulgaria)	2	Valentin Pleșea	2	
17–20 November 2022	Romania; Plovdiv (Bulgaria)	3	Mihai Băbăiță	3	
9–11 December 2022	Indonesia; Surakarta	1	Dika Alif	1	Wiji Lestari
9–11 December 2022	Indonesia; Surakarta	2	Andi Jolata	2	Ratu Afifah
9–11 December 2022	Indonesia; Surakarta	3	Reno Yudho	3	Ananda Diva
9–11 December 2022	Norway; Sola	1	Sondre Weiseth	1	Sonja Moi
9–11 December 2022	Norway; Sola	2	Aasmund Groven Lindtveit	2	Nora Tveit
9–11 December 2022	Norway; Sola	3	Frode Svortevik Birkeland	3	Pernille Feldmann
10–11 December 2022	Chile; Santiago	1	Diego Fuenzalida	1	Daniela Colilef
10–11 December 2022	Chile; Santiago	2	Vicente Ramírez Gómez	2	Paola Muñoz
10–11 December 2022	Chile; Santiago	3	Alejandro Morales Alvarez	3	Paula Molina Rodríguez
10–11 December 2022	Sweden; Falun	1	Christoffer Eriksson	1	
10–11 December 2022	Sweden; Falun	2	Jonas Månsson	2	
10–11 December 2022	Sweden; Falun	3	Hugo Porath	3	
10–14 December 2022	India; Guwahati	1	Ronaldo Laitonjam	1	Triyasha Paul
10–14 December 2022	India; Guwahati	2	David Beckham Elkathchoongo	2	Shushikala Agashe
10–14 December 2022	India; Guwahati	3	Yanglem Rojit Singh	3	Celestina Chelobroy
27–29 December 2022	Netherlands; Apeldoorn	1	Tijmen van Loon	1	Kimberly Kalee
27–29 December 2022	Netherlands; Apeldoorn	2	Lars Romijn	2	Lonneke Geraerts
27–29 December 2022	Netherlands; Apeldoorn	3	Daan Kool	3	Roosmarijn Geluk
27 January 2023 (Men's); 26 December 2022 (Women's)	Belgium; Ghent	1	Tuur Dens	1	Valerie Jenaer
27 January 2023 (Men's); 26 December 2022 (Women's)	Belgium; Ghent	2	Noah Vandenbranden	2	Julie Nicolaes
27 January 2023 (Men's); 26 December 2022 (Women's)	Belgium; Ghent	3	Thibaut Bernard	3	Hélène Hesters
5 January 2023	France; Roubaix	1	Melvin Landerneau	1	Mathilde Gros
5 January 2023	France; Roubaix	2	Tom Derache	2	Taky Marie-Divine Kouamé
5 January 2023	France; Roubaix	3	Quentin Lafargue	3	Julie Michaux
6–8 January 2023	Canada; Milton	1	James Hedgcock	1	Kelsey Mitchell
6–8 January 2023	Canada; Milton	2	Ryan Dodyk	2	Lauriane Genest
6–8 January 2023	Canada; Milton	3	Dylan Bibic	3	Sarah Orban
14 January 2023	Denmark; Odense	1	Mathias Møller Jørgensen	1	Karoline Hemmsen
14 January 2023	Denmark; Odense	2	Anders Fynbo	2	Ellen Klinge
14 January 2023	Denmark; Odense	3	Arne Birkemose	3	Victoria Lund
26–29 January 2023	United Kingdom; Newport	1	Joe Holt	1	Emma Finucane
26–29 January 2023	United Kingdom; Newport	2	Calum Moir	2	Sophie Capewell
26–29 January 2023	United Kingdom; Newport	3	Tom Ward	3	Lauren Bell
9 February 2023	Mexico; Guadalajara	1	Juan Carlos Ruíz Terán	1	Jessica Salazar
9 February 2023	Mexico; Guadalajara	2	Edgar Verdugo	2	Daniela Gaxiola
9 February 2023	Mexico; Guadalajara	3	Jesús Daniel García Reyes	3	Yuli Verdugo
1–5 March 2023	New Zealand; Invercargill	1	Luke Blackwood	1	Amelia Sykes
1–5 March 2023	New Zealand; Invercargill	2	Edward Pawson	2	Alana Breen
1–5 March 2023	New Zealand; Invercargill	3	Oliver Watson-Palmer	3	Sophie de Vries
8–12 March 2023	Brazil; Indaiatuba	1	Kacio Fonseca	1	Maria Tereza Müller
8–12 March 2023	Brazil; Indaiatuba	2	Fernando Sikora Júnior	2	Carolina Barbosa
8–12 March 2023	Brazil; Indaiatuba	3	Franklin Gomes de Almeida	3	Sumaia Ali Ribeiro
17 March 2023	Australia; Brisbane	1	Byron Davies	1	Alessia McCaig
17 March 2023	Australia; Brisbane	2	Thomas Cornish	2	Breanna Hargrave
17 March 2023	Australia; Brisbane	3	Josh Duffy	3	Molly McGill
17–19 March 2023	Ecuador; Quito	1	Francisco Nazareno	1	Génesis Tarira
17–19 March 2023	Ecuador; Quito	2	Alan Albán	2	Ruth Rendon
17–19 March 2023	Ecuador; Quito	3	Kevin Canchingre	3	Patricia Chala
22–24 March 2023	Israel; Tel Aviv	1	Nevo Shuval	1	
22–24 March 2023	Israel; Tel Aviv	2	Ido Tal Peleg	2	
22–24 March 2023	Israel; Tel Aviv	3	Guy Timor	3	
2 April	South Africa; Cape Town	1	Jean Spies	1	Odette Remus
2 April	South Africa; Cape Town	2	Johannes Wikus Myburgh	2	Ashleigh Parsons
2 April	South Africa; Cape Town	3	James Swart	3	Michaela Lubbe
8–12 April	Kazakhstan; Astana	3	Kirill Kurdidi	1	Yuliya Golubkova
8–12 April	Kazakhstan; Astana	2	Ruslan Yelyubayev	2	Anzhela Solovyeva
8–12 April	Kazakhstan; Astana	3	Dmitriy Noskov	3	Alina Yunkman
28–30 April	Bolivia; La Paz	1	Sebastián Mena	1	Kenia Karina Almanza Choré
28–30 April	Bolivia; La Paz	2	Alejandro Luna	2	Elizabeth Vásquez Avila
28–30 April	Bolivia; La Paz	3	Mateo Saravia Alanes	3	Brenda Saavedra Zurita
4–8 May	Trinidad and Tobago; Couva	1	Corey Samuel	1	Adrianna Seyjagat
4–8 May	Trinidad and Tobago; Couva	2		2	Kanika Paul-Payne
4–8 May	Trinidad and Tobago; Couva	3		3	
14 May	Japan; Shizuoka	1	Ryuto Ichida	1	Mina Sato
14 May	Japan; Shizuoka	2	Minato Nakaishi	2	Aki Sakai
14 May	Japan; Shizuoka	3	Kyohei Shinzan	3	Fuko Umekawa
15–19 May	Malaysia; Nilai	1	Azizulhasni Awang	1	Nurul Izzah Izzati Mohd Asri
15–19 May	Malaysia; Nilai	2	Muhammad Fadhil Mohd Zonis	2	Anis Amira Rosidi
15–19 May	Malaysia; Nilai	3	Muhammad Ridwan Sahrom	3	Nurul Aliana Syafika Azizan
19–20 May	Jamaica; Kingston	1	Daniel Palmer	1	
19–20 May	Jamaica; Kingston	2	Demar Golding	2	
19–20 May	Jamaica; Kingston	3	Bradley McFarlane	3	
1 June	Ukraine; Lviv	1	Roman Gladysh	1	Alla Biletska
1 June	Ukraine; Lviv	2	Vladyslav Denysenko	2	Karolina Kelyukh
1 June	Ukraine; Lviv	3	Andriy Rozgonyuk	3	Elizaveta Moghir
9–11 June	Spain; Valencia	1	Alejandro Martínez	1	Helena Casas
9–11 June	Spain; Valencia	2	José Moreno Sánchez	2	Eva Anguela
9–11 June	Spain; Valencia	3	Ekain Jiménez Elizondo	3	Isabel Ferreres
13 June	Switzerland	1	Nicolò De Lisi	1	
13 June	Switzerland	2	Luca Bühlmann	2	
13 June	Switzerland	3	Alex Vogel	3	
14–18 June	Germany; Cottbus	1	Maximilian Dörnbach	1	Emma Hinze
14–18 June	Germany; Cottbus	2	Willy Weinrich	2	Lea Friedrich
14–18 June	Germany; Cottbus	3	Marc Jurczyk	3	Pauline Grabosch
17 June	Croatia; Zagreb	1	Ivan Greiner	1	
17 June	Croatia; Zagreb	2	Lorenzo Marenzi	2	
17 June	Croatia; Zagreb	3	Matija Beđić	3	
27–29 June	Italy; Fiorenzuola d'Arda	1	Francesco Ceci	1	Miriam Vece
27–29 June	Italy; Fiorenzuola d'Arda	2	Francesco Lamon	2	Martina Fidanza
27–29 June	Italy; Fiorenzuola d'Arda	3	Davide Boscaro	3	Giada Capobianchi
30 June – 2 July	Czech Republic; Brno	1	Dominik Topinka	1	Veronika Jaborníková
30 June – 2 July	Czech Republic; Brno	2	Robin Wagner	2	Anna Jaborníková
30 June – 2 July	Czech Republic; Brno	3	Jakub Malášek	3	Natálie Mikšaníková
1–2 July	Georgia; Tbilisi	1	Giorgi Khorguani	1	
1–2 July	Georgia; Tbilisi	2	Avtandil Piranishvili	2	
1–2 July	Georgia; Tbilisi	3	Valeri Mamulashvili	3	
5–9 July	United States; Carson	1	Jamie Alvord	1	Mandy Marquardt
5–9 July	United States; Carson	2	David Domonoske	2	McKenna McKee
5–9 July	United States; Carson	3	Chris Murphy	3	Keely Ainslie
6–8 July	Azerbaijan; Baku	1	Nofal Nuriyev	1	
6–8 July	Azerbaijan; Baku	2	Samir Jabrayilov	2	
6–8 July	Azerbaijan; Baku	3	Kamran Mirzakhanov	3	
14–15 July	Peru; Lima	1	Francis Cachique	1	Kaori Quispe
14–15 July	Peru; Lima	2	Maximiliano Coila	2	Alejandra Huamaní
14–15 July	Peru; Lima	3	Charles González	3	Bethzabé Coila
20–23 July	Colombia	1	Cristian Ortega	1	Martha Bayona
20–23 July	Colombia	2	Santiago Ramírez	2	Valeria Cardozo
20–23 July	Colombia	3	Rubén Murillo	3	Marianis Salazar
28 July	Finland	1	Severi Savukoski	1	Sini Savolainen
28 July	Finland	2	Mika Simola	2	Iisa Lepistö
28 July	Finland	3	Kalle Toivanen	3	Jaana Hyvärinen
28–30 July	Greece; Athens	1	Konstantinos Livanos	1	Ioanna Plega-Gavrilaki
28–30 July	Greece; Athens	2	Stamatios Savvakis	2	Despina Tourli
28–30 July	Greece; Athens	3	Miltiadis Charovas	3	Vasiliki Fragkioudaki
5 August & 26–27 August	Ireland; Dublin	1	Harvey Barnes	1	Clodagh Ní Ghallchóir
5 August & 26–27 August	Ireland; Dublin	2	Cian Keogh	2	Deirbhle Ivory
5 August & 26–27 August	Ireland; Dublin	3	Callum O'Toole	3	Orla Mary Harrison
6 August	El Salvador	1		1	
6 August	El Salvador	2		2	
6 August	El Salvador	3		3	
15–17 September	Poland	1	Patryk Rajkowski	1	Marlena Karwacka
15–17 September	Poland	2	Mateusz Rudyk	2	Paulina Petri
15–17 September	Poland	3	Maciej Bielecki	3	Nikola Seremak
15–17 September	Thailand	1	Thanawut Sanikwathi	1	
15–17 September	Thailand	2	Chetawan Samngamma	2	
15–17 September	Thailand	3		3	
27–29 September 2023 (2023 Edition)	Romania; Plovdiv (Bulgaria)	1	Daniel Crista	1	
27–29 September 2023 (2023 Edition)	Romania; Plovdiv (Bulgaria)	2	Valentin Pleşea	2	
27–29 September 2023 (2023 Edition)	Romania; Plovdiv (Bulgaria)	3	Carol-Eduard Novak	3	
4–8 October	Argentina	1	Lucas Vilar	1	Natalia Vera
4–8 October	Argentina	2	Juan Andrés Castillo	2	Valentina Luna
4–8 October	Argentina	3	Franco Villarroel	3	Milagros Sanabria
13–15 October	Bulgaria	1	Miroslav Minchev	1	Ivana Tonkova
13–15 October	Bulgaria	2	Georgi Lumparov	2	Iveta Kostadinova
13–15 October	Bulgaria	3	Vasil Popov	3	Mihaela Grozdanova
21 October	Slovenia	1	Eduard Žalar	1	
21 October	Slovenia	2	Mark Poberaj	2	
21 October	Slovenia	3	Natan Gregorčič	3	
30 November – 4 December	India	1	David Elkatohchoongo	1	Alena Reji
30 November – 4 December	India	2	Ronaldo Laitonjam	2	Celestina Chelobroy
30 November – 4 December	India	3	Devendra Bishnoi	3	Triyasha Paul
8–10 December	Chile	1	Josafat Cárdenas	1	Paula Molina Rodríguez
8–10 December	Chile	2	Diego Fuenzalida Galaz	2	Paola Muñoz
8–10 December	Chile	3	Joaquín Fuenzalida Galaz	3	Mariela Scott
10 December	Norway	1	Sebastian Kartfjord	1	Sonja Moi
10 December	Norway	2	Aasmund Groven Lindtveit	2	Nora Tveit
10 December	Norway	3	Sander Gysland	3	Pernille Feldmann
22 & 23 December	Belgium	1	Tuur Dens	1	Julie Nicolaes
22 & 23 December	Belgium	2	Gianluca Pollefliet	2	Valerie Jenaer
22 & 23 December	Belgium	3	Thibaut Bernard	3	Marith Vanhove
27 December	Netherlands	1	Harrie Lavreysen	1	Kimberly Kalee
27 December	Netherlands	2	Daan Kool	2	Lonneke Geraerts
27 December	Netherlands	3	Tijmen van Loon	3	Ruby Huisman

=== Elimination Race ===
Date	Venue	Podium (Men)		Podium (Women)	
17–20 November 2022	Romania; Plovdiv (Bulgaria)	1	Daniel Crista	1	
17–20 November 2022	Romania; Plovdiv (Bulgaria)	2	Valentin Pleșea	2	
17–20 November 2022	Romania; Plovdiv (Bulgaria)	3	Mihai Băbăiță	3	
9–11 December 2022	Norway; Sola	1	Emil Skår	1	Anita Stenberg
9–11 December 2022	Norway; Sola	2	Iver Knotten	2	Nora Tveit
9–11 December 2022	Norway; Sola	3	Anders Oddli	3	Pernille Feldmann
10–11 December 2022	Czech Republic; Prague	1	Jan Voneš	1	Petra Ševčíková
10–11 December 2022	Czech Republic; Prague	2	Milan Kadlec	2	Veronika Bartoníková
10–11 December 2022	Czech Republic; Prague	3	Adam Křenek	3	Kateřina Kohoutková
27–29 December 2022	Netherlands; Apeldoorn	1	Matthijs Büchli	1	Lorena Wiebes
27–29 December 2022	Netherlands; Apeldoorn	2	Philip Heijnen	2	Nina Kessler
27–29 December 2022	Netherlands; Apeldoorn	3	Sten Verzijl	3	Marjolein van 't Geloof
5 January 2023	France; Roubaix	1	Thomas Boudat	1	Valentine Fortin
5 January 2023	France; Roubaix	2	Valentin Tabellion	2	Victoire Berteau
5 January 2023	France; Roubaix	3	Benjamin Thomas	3	Clara Copponi
15 January 2023	Portugal; Anadia	1	Rui Oliveira	1	Maria Martins
15 January 2023	Portugal; Anadia	2	Iúri Leitão	2	Daniela Campos
15 January 2023	Portugal; Anadia	3	Ivo Oliveira	3	Beatriz Roxo
28–29 January	Belgium; Ghent	1	Jules Hesters	1	Lotte Kopecky
28–29 January	Belgium; Ghent	2	Gianluca Pollefliet	2	Katrijn De Clercq
28–29 January	Belgium; Ghent	3	Arthur Senrame	3	Hélène Hesters
10 February 2023	Mexico; Guadalajara	1	Ricardo Peña Salas	1	Victoria Velasco
10 February 2023	Mexico; Guadalajara	2	Ignacio Prado	2	Yareli Acevedo
10 February 2023	Mexico; Guadalajara	3	Sebastián Ruiz Terán	3	Jacqueline Tamez
1–5 March 2023	New Zealand; Invercargill	1	Oliver Watson-Palmer	1	Amelia Sykes
1–5 March 2023	New Zealand; Invercargill	2	Kaio Lart	2	Belle Judd
1–5 March 2023	New Zealand; Invercargill	3	Matt Davis	3	Samantha Walker
8–12 March 2023	Brazil; Indaiatuba	1	Pedro Freitas de Oliveira	1	Ana Paula Casetta
8–12 March 2023	Brazil; Indaiatuba	2	Lauro Chaman	2	Amanda Kunkel
8–12 March 2023	Brazil; Indaiatuba	3	Samuel Reikdal	3	Larissa Castelari
10 March 2023	United Arab Emirates; Sharjah	1	Ahmed Al Mansoori	1	
10 March 2023	United Arab Emirates; Sharjah	2	Mohammed Youcef Al Mansoori	2	
10 March 2023	United Arab Emirates; Sharjah	3	Omar Al Mashghouni	3	
17–19 March 2023	Ecuador; Quito	1	Sebastián Novoa	1	
17–19 March 2023	Ecuador; Quito	2	Wilson Haro	2	
17–19 March 2023	Ecuador; Quito	3	Cristian Gutiérrez Pianda	3	
22–24 March 2023	Israel; Tel Aviv	1	Rotem Tene	1	Ori Bash Dubinski
22–24 March 2023	Israel; Tel Aviv	2	Amit Keinan	2	Maayan Tzur
22–24 March 2023	Israel; Tel Aviv	3	Alon Yogev	3	
30 March 2023 (Women's); 1 April (Men's)	Switzerland; Grenchen	1	Alex Vogel	1	Aline Seitz
30 March 2023 (Women's); 1 April (Men's)	Switzerland; Grenchen	2	Valère Thiébaud	2	Michelle Andres
30 March 2023 (Women's); 1 April (Men's)	Switzerland; Grenchen	3	Claudio Imhof	3	Jasmin Liechti
1 April	South Africa; Cape Town	1	Joshua van Wyk	1	S'Annara Grove
1 April	South Africa; Cape Town	2	David Maree	2	Maroesjka Matthee
1 April	South Africa; Cape Town	3	Wynand Hofmeyr	3	Danielle Van Niekerk
4–8 April	Uzbekistan; Namangan	1	Vladislav Troman	1	Margarita Misyurina
4–8 April	Uzbekistan; Namangan	2	Daniil Fedorov	2	Nafosat Kozieva
4–8 April	Uzbekistan; Namangan	3	Danil Evdokimov	3	Asal Rizaeva
8 April	Kazakhstan; Astana	1	Ramis Dinmukhametov	1	Marina Kurnossova
8 April	Kazakhstan; Astana	2	Sergey Karmazhakov	2	Bota Batyrbekova
8 April	Kazakhstan; Astana	3	Assylkhan Turar	3	Akpeil Osim
28–30 April	Bolivia; La Paz	1	Alejandro Luna	1	
28–30 April	Bolivia; La Paz	2	Sebastián Mena	2	
28–30 April	Bolivia; La Paz	3	Mateo Saravia Alanes	3	
5 May	Trinidad and Tobago; Couva	1	Akil Campbell	1	
5 May	Trinidad and Tobago; Couva	2	Tariq Woods	2	
5 May	Trinidad and Tobago; Couva	3	Adam Alexander	3	
5 May	Barbados; Couva (Trinidad & Tobago)	1	Edwin Sutherland	1	
5 May	Barbados; Couva (Trinidad & Tobago)	2	Jamol Eastmond	2	
5 May	Barbados; Couva (Trinidad & Tobago)	3		3	
11 May	Japan; Shizuoka	1	Eiya Hashimoto	1	Yumi Kajihara
11 May	Japan; Shizuoka	2	Naoki Kojima	2	Maho Kakita
11 May	Japan; Shizuoka	3	Shunsuke Imamura	3	Tsuyaka Uchino
19–20 May	Jamaica; Kingston	1	Andrew Ramsay	1	
19–20 May	Jamaica; Kingston	2	Bradley McFarlane	2	
19–20 May	Jamaica; Kingston	3	Jerome Forrest	3	
3 June	Ukraine; Lviv	1	Yurii Shcherban	1	Anna Kolyzhuk
3 June	Ukraine; Lviv	2	Maksym Malinnikov	2	Tetyana Klimchenko
3 June	Ukraine; Lviv	3	Maksym Vasilyev	3	Yuliia Skoryshchenko
3–4 June	Hungary; Budapest	1	Ádám Kristóf Karl	1	
3–4 June	Hungary; Budapest	2	Viktor Filutás	2	
3–4 June	Hungary; Budapest	3	Sándor Szalontay	3	
4 June	United Kingdom; Newport	1	Matt Rotherham	1	
4 June	United Kingdom; Newport	2	Tom Ward	2	
4 June	United Kingdom; Newport	3	David Brearley	3	
10–11 June	Slovakia; Prešov	1	Pavol Rovder	1	
10–11 June	Slovakia; Prešov	2	Martin Chren	2	
10–11 June	Slovakia; Prešov	3	Denis Hoza	3	
14–18 June	Germany; Cottbus	1	Moritz Malcharek	1	Franziska Brauße
14–18 June	Germany; Cottbus	2	Tobias Müller	2	Lea Lin Teutenberg
14–18 June	Germany; Cottbus	3	Benjamin Boos	3	Fabienne Jährig
27 June	Denmark; Aarhus	1	Nicklas Amdi Pedersen	1	Ida Fialla
27 June	Denmark; Aarhus	2	Anders Fynbo	2	Anika Rasmussen
27 June	Denmark; Aarhus	3	Ruben Zilas Larsen	3	Emma Hermansen
27–29 June	Italy; Fiorenzuola d'Arda	1	Francesco Lamon	1	Silvia Zanardi
27–29 June	Italy; Fiorenzuola d'Arda	2	Elia Viviani	2	Chiara Consonni
27–29 June	Italy; Fiorenzuola d'Arda	3	Matteo Donegà	3	Martina Fidanza
1–2 July	Georgia; Tbilisi	1	Giorgi Khorguani	1	
1–2 July	Georgia; Tbilisi	2	Nika Sitchinava	2	
1–2 July	Georgia; Tbilisi	3	Valeri Mamulashvili	3	
5–9 July	United States; Carson	1	Eddy Huntsman	1	Jennifer Valente
5–9 July	United States; Carson	2	David Domonoske	2	Chloe Patrick
5–9 July	United States; Carson	3	John Bowie	3	Danielle Morshead
6–8 July	Azerbaijan; Baku	1	Kamran Mirzakhanov	1	
6–8 July	Azerbaijan; Baku	2	Samir Jabrayilov	2	
6–8 July	Azerbaijan; Baku	3	Nofal Nuriyev	3	
20–23 July	Colombia; Medellín	1	Camilo Sepúlveda	1	Juliana Londoño
20–23 July	Colombia; Medellín	2	Julián Osorio	2	Kimberly Escobar
20–23 July	Colombia; Medellín	3	Juan Camilo Arbelaez	3	Barbara Zapata
28–30 July	Greece; Athens	1	Zisis Soulios	1	Argiro Milaki
28–30 July	Greece; Athens	2	Nikolaos Michail Drakos	2	Vasiliki Kokkali
28–30 July	Greece; Athens	3	Stefanos Klokas	3	Konstantina Farfara
6 August	El Salvador	1		1	
6 August	El Salvador	2		2	
6 August	El Salvador	3		3	
15–17 September	Poland	1	Adam Woźniak	1	Olga Wankiewicz
15–17 September	Poland	2	Piotr Maslak	2	Patrycja Lorkowska
15–17 September	Poland	3	Kamil Dolak	3	Oliwia Majewska
15–17 September	Thailand	1	Janluang Jetsada	1	
15–17 September	Thailand	2	Chonlachai Jaisawang	2	
15–17 September	Thailand	3	Patompob Phonarjthan	3	
27–29 September 2023 (2023 Edition)	Romania; Plovdiv (Bulgaria)	1		1	Cătălina Cătineanu
27–29 September 2023 (2023 Edition)	Romania; Plovdiv (Bulgaria)	2		2	Maria-Ecaterina Stancu
27–29 September 2023 (2023 Edition)	Romania; Plovdiv (Bulgaria)	3		3	Georgeta Ungureanu
29 September – 8 October 2023	Costa Rica	1	Jordan Rodríguez Arias	1	Valeria Badilla
29 September – 8 October 2023	Costa Rica	2	Jefry Jiménez	2	
29 September – 8 October 2023	Costa Rica	3	Berny Sánchez	3	
4–8 October	Argentina	1	Daniel Juárez	1	Cristina Irma Greve
4–8 October	Argentina	2	Hugo Velázquez	2	Ludmila Ángela Aguirre
4–8 October	Argentina	3	Cristian Romero	3	Micaela Gutierrez
7–8 October	Austria	1	Maximilian Schmidbauer	1	Verena Eberhardt
7–8 October	Austria	2	Tim Wafler	2	Leila Gschwentner
7–8 October	Austria	3	Alexander Hajek	3	Carolina Hajek
13–15 October	Bulgaria	1	Martin Papanov	1	
13–15 October	Bulgaria	2	Georgi Lumparov	2	
13–15 October	Bulgaria	3	Petar Dimitrov	3	
21 October	Slovenia	1	Natan Gregorčič	1	
21 October	Slovenia	2	Luka Ziherl	2	
21 October	Slovenia	3	Tilen Finkšt	3	
9–11 December	Czech Republic	1	Adam Křenek	1	Petra Ševčíková
9–11 December	Czech Republic	2	Radovan Štec	2	Jarmila Machačová
9–11 December	Czech Republic	3	Jan Voneš	3	Barbora Němcová
10 December	Norway	1	Iver Knotten	1	Nora Tveit
10 December	Norway	2	Tim Edvard Pettersen	2	Anita Stenberg
10 December	Norway	3	Kristoffer Forus	3	
22 & 23 December	Belgium	1	Tuur Dens	1	Marith Vanhove
22 & 23 December	Belgium	2	Jules Hesters	2	Katrijn de Clercq
22 & 23 December	Belgium	3	Gianluca Pollefliet	3	Sara Maes
28 & 29 December	Netherlands	1	Vincent Hoppezak	1	Lorena Wiebes
28 & 29 December	Netherlands	2	Maikel Zijlaard	2	Marit Raaijmakers
28 & 29 December	Netherlands	3	Jan-Willem van Schip	3	Juliet Eickhof

=== Omnium ===
Date	Venue	Podium (Men)		Podium (Women)	
30 October 2022 (Men)	Sweden; Falun	1	Gustav Johansson	1	
30 October 2022 (Men)	Sweden; Falun	2	Hugo Porath	2	
30 October 2022 (Men)	Sweden; Falun	3	Christoffer Eriksson	3	
17–20 November 2022	Romania; Plovdiv (Bulgaria)	1	Daniel Crista	1	
17–20 November 2022	Romania; Plovdiv (Bulgaria)	2	Valentin Plesea	2	
17–20 November 2022	Romania; Plovdiv (Bulgaria)	3	Mihai Sebastian Paveliu	3	
5 December 2022	Malaysia; Nilai	1	Muhammad Yusri Shaari	1	Nur Aisyah Mohamad Zubir
5 December 2022	Malaysia; Nilai	2	Abdul Azim Aliyas	2	Ci Hui Nyo
5 December 2022	Malaysia; Nilai	3	Ariff Danial Noor Roseidi	3	Siti Nur Adibah Akma Mohd Fuad
9–11 December 2022	Norway; Sola	1	Iver Knotten	1	Anita Stenberg
9–11 December 2022	Norway; Sola	2	Emil Skår	2	Nora Tveit
9–11 December 2022	Norway; Sola	3	Anders Oddli	3	
10–11 December 2022	Chile; Santiago	1	Jacob Thomas Decar	1	Catalina Soto
10–11 December 2022	Chile; Santiago	2	Christopher Ponce Mejías	2	Scarlet Cortes
10–11 December 2022	Chile; Santiago	3	Cristián Arriagada Pizarro	3	Leonor Diaz Espinoza
10–11 December 2022	Czech Republic; Prague	1	Milan Kadlec	1	Petra Ševčíková
10–11 December 2022	Czech Republic; Prague	2	Adam Křenek	2	Kateřina Kohoutková
10–11 December 2022	Czech Republic; Prague	3	Matyáš Koblížek	3	Kristýna Burlová
10–14 December 2022	India; Guwahati	1	Vishavjeet Singh	1	
10–14 December 2022	India; Guwahati	2	Manjeet Singh	2	
10–14 December 2022	India; Guwahati	3	Mukesh Kaswan	3	
16–17 December 2022	Germany; Frankfurt	1	Tim Torn Teutenberg	1	Lea Lin Teutenberg
16–17 December 2022	Germany; Frankfurt	2	Jasper Schröder	2	Isabel Kaempfert
16–17 December 2022	Germany; Frankfurt	3	Moritz Malcharek	3	Lena Charlotte Reißner
16–18 December 2022	New Zealand; Cambridge	1	Corbin Strong	1	Ally Wollaston
16–18 December 2022	New Zealand; Cambridge	2	Campbell Stewart	2	Bryony Botha
16–18 December 2022	New Zealand; Cambridge	3	Tom Sexton	3	Ella Wyllie
17 December 2022	Netherlands; Apeldoorn	1	Elmar Abma	1	Lorena Wiebes
17 December 2022	Netherlands; Apeldoorn	2	Alexander Konijn	2	Mylène de Zoete
17 December 2022	Netherlands; Apeldoorn	3	Sten Verzijl	3	Tessa Dijksman
28–31 December 2022	China; Changxing County	1	Ze Yu	1	(Hong Kong) Lee Sze Wing
28–31 December 2022	China; Changxing County	2	Hongfei Zhou	2	Yuan Cao
28–31 December 2022	China; Changxing County	3	(Hong Kong) Leung Chun Wing	3	Siqi Guan
5 January 2023	France; Roubaix	1	Valentin Tabellion	1	Marion Borras
5 January 2023	France; Roubaix	2	Thomas Boudat	2	Marie Le Net
5 January 2023	France; Roubaix	3	Donavan Grondin	3	Clara Copponi
6–8 January 2023	Canada; Milton	1	Dylan Bibic	1	Ariane Bonhomme
6–8 January 2023	Canada; Milton	2	Michael Foley	2	Erin Attwell
6–8 January 2023	Canada; Milton	3	Chris Ernst	3	Klara Lylyk
14–15 January 2023	Portugal; Anadia	1	Rui Oliveira	1	Maria Martins
14–15 January 2023	Portugal; Anadia	2	Ivo Oliveira	2	Daniela Campos
14–15 January 2023	Portugal; Anadia	3	João Matias	3	Beatriz Roxo
28–29 January	Belgium; Ghent	1	Tuur Dens	1	Lotte Kopecky
28–29 January	Belgium; Ghent	2	Jules Hesters	2	Katrijn De Clercq
28–29 January	Belgium; Ghent	3	Noah Vandenbranden	3	Shari Bossuyt
9 February 2023	Mexico; Guadalajara	1	Tomas Aguirre	1	Victoria Velasco
9 February 2023	Mexico; Guadalajara	2	Ignacio Prado	2	Jessica Bonilla
9 February 2023	Mexico; Guadalajara	3	Ricardo Peña Salas	3	Yareli Acevedo
8–12 March 2023	Brazil; Indaiatuba	1	Lauro Chaman	1	Wellyda Rodrigues
8–12 March 2023	Brazil; Indaiatuba	2	Samuel Reikdal	2	Alice Leite
8–12 March 2023	Brazil; Indaiatuba	3	Armando Camargo Filho	3	Ana Paula Finco
10 March 2023	United Arab Emirates; Sharjah	1	Ahmed Al Mansoori	1	
10 March 2023	United Arab Emirates; Sharjah	2	Mohammed Youcef Al Mansoori	2	
10 March 2023	United Arab Emirates; Sharjah	3	(Comoros) Fadhel Hussein	3	
17–19 March 2023	Ecuador; Quito	1	Efrain Quishpe	1	
17–19 March 2023	Ecuador; Quito	2	David Villareal	2	
17–19 March 2023	Ecuador; Quito	3	Cristian Pita	3	
22–24 March 2023	Israel; Tel Aviv	1	Rotem Tene	1	Ori Bash Dubinski
22–24 March 2023	Israel; Tel Aviv	2	Alon Yogev	2	Maayan Tzur
22–24 March 2023	Israel; Tel Aviv	3	Amit Keinan	3	
25 March 2023	Spain; Palma de Mallorca	1	Erik Martorell	1	Laura Rodríguez
25 March 2023	Spain; Palma de Mallorca	2	Álvaro Navas	2	Marina Garau
25 March 2023	Spain; Palma de Mallorca	3	Noel Martín	3	Eva Anguela
31 March 2023 (Men's); 1 April (Women's)	Switzerland; Grenchen	1	Valère Thiébaud	1	Aline Seitz
31 March 2023 (Men's); 1 April (Women's)	Switzerland; Grenchen	2	Claudio Imhof	2	Fabienne Buri
31 March 2023 (Men's); 1 April (Women's)	Switzerland; Grenchen	3	Lukas Rüegg	3	Lorena Leu
4–8 April	Uzbekistan; Namangan	1	Dmitriy Bocharov	1	Olga Zabelinskaya
4–8 April	Uzbekistan; Namangan	2	Aleksey Fomovskiy	1	Margarita Misyurina
4–8 April	Uzbekistan; Namangan	3	Daniil Fedorov	2	Madina Kakhkhorova
8–12 April	Kazakhstan; Astana	1	Dmitriy Noskov	1	Akpeiil Ossim
8–12 April	Kazakhstan; Astana	2	Ramis Dinmukhametov	2	Marina Kurnossova
8–12 April	Kazakhstan; Astana	3	Artyom Zakharov	3	Makhabbat Umutzhanova
28–30 April	Bolivia; La Paz	1		1	
28–30 April	Bolivia; La Paz	2		2	
28–30 April	Bolivia; La Paz	3		3	
4–8 May	Trinidad and Tobago; Couva	1	Akil Campbell	1	Cheyenne Awai
4–8 May	Trinidad and Tobago; Couva	2	Adam Alexander	2	
4–8 May	Trinidad and Tobago; Couva	3	Liam Trepte	3	
12–13 May	Japan; Shizuoka	1	Shoi Matsuda	1	Yumi Kajihara
12–13 May	Japan; Shizuoka	2	Naoki Kojima	2	Tsuyaka Uchino
12–13 May	Japan; Shizuoka	3	Kazushige Kuboki	3	Mizuki Ikeda
19–20 May	Jamaica; Kingston	1	Andrew Ramsay	1	
19–20 May	Jamaica; Kingston	2	Bradley McFarlane	2	
19–20 May	Jamaica; Kingston	3	Jerome Forrest	3	
3–4 June	Hungary; Budapest	1	Bertold Drijver	1	
3–4 June	Hungary; Budapest	2	Viktor Filutás	2	
3–4 June	Hungary; Budapest	3	Ádám Kristóf Karl	3	
5 June	Ukraine; Lviv	1	Roman Gladysh	1	Tetyana Klimchenko
5 June	Ukraine; Lviv	2	Vladyslav Shcherban	2	Anna Kolyzhuk
5 June	Ukraine; Lviv	3	Maksym Malinnikov	3	Yuliia Skoryshchenko
10–11 June	Slovakia; Prešov	1	Pavol Rovder	1	
10–11 June	Slovakia; Prešov	2	Martin Chren	2	
10–11 June	Slovakia; Prešov	3	Denis Hoza	3	
27–29 June	Italy; Fiorenzuola d'Arda	1	Francesco Lamon	1	Martina Fidanza
27–29 June	Italy; Fiorenzuola d'Arda	2	Matteo Donegà	2	Silvia Zanardi
27–29 June	Italy; Fiorenzuola d'Arda	3	Mattia Pinazzi	3	Martina Alzini
1 July	Ireland; Dublin	1	Aaron Wade	1	Caoimhe O'Brien
1 July	Ireland; Dublin	2	Cian Keogh	2	Aoife O'Brien
1 July	Ireland; Dublin	3	JB Murphy	3	Autumn Collins
1–5 July	South Korea; Yangyang County	1	Park Sang-hoon	1	Shin Ji-eun
1–5 July	South Korea; Yangyang County	2	Shin Dong-in	2	Kim Hyowŏn
1–5 July	South Korea; Yangyang County	3	Kim Hyeon-Seok	3	Song Min-ji
5–9 July	United States; Carson	1	Anders Johnson	1	Jennifer Valente
5–9 July	United States; Carson	2	Colby Lange	2	Chloe Patrick
5–9 July	United States; Carson	3	Lance Abshire	3	Elizabeth Stevenson
11–15 July	Iran; Tehran	1	Mohammad Ganjkhanlou	1	
11–15 July	Iran; Tehran	2	Mehdi Sohrabi	2	
11–15 July	Iran; Tehran	3	Payam Sadipour	3	
14–15 July	Peru; Lima	1	Hugo Ruiz	1	Alejandra Huamaní
14–15 July	Peru; Lima	2	Robinson Ruiz	2	Bethzabé Coila
14–15 July	Peru; Lima	3	Maximiliano Coila	3	Kaori Quispe
20–23 July	Colombia	1	Juan Esteban González	1	Lina Hernández
20–23 July	Colombia	2	Walter Pedraza	2	Lina Rojas
20–23 July	Colombia	3	Néstor Rueda	3	Yesica Hurtado
23–24 July	Chinese Taipei; Taichung	1	Feng Chun-kai	1	
23–24 July	Chinese Taipei; Taichung	2	Chih Sheng Chang	2	
23–24 July	Chinese Taipei; Taichung	3	Chen Chien-liang	3	
28 July	Greece; Athens	1	Zisis Soulios	1	Argiro Milaki
28 July	Greece; Athens	2	Nikiforos Arvanitou	2	Vasiliki Kokkali
28 July	Greece; Athens	3	Georgios Boutopoulos	3	Glykeria Angelaki
30 July	Finland	1	Severi Savukoski	1	
30 July	Finland	2	Kalle Toivanen	2	
30 July	Finland	3	Juhana Hietala	3	
27 August	United Kingdom	1	Rhys Britton	1	Grace Lister
27 August	United Kingdom	2	William Perrett	2	Dannielle Khan
27 August	United Kingdom	3	Jacob Vaughan	3	Lucy Nelson
15–17 September	Poland	1	Konrad Waliniak	1	Wiktoria Pikulik
15–17 September	Poland	2	Wojciech Pszczolarski	2	Nikol Płosaj
15–17 September	Poland	3	Kacper Majewski	3	Olga Wankiewicz
15–17 September	Thailand	1	Setthawut Yordsuwan	1	
15–17 September	Thailand	2	Ponlawat Sakunthanaplum	2	
15–17 September	Thailand	3	Suhaimeen Sayor	3	
23 September	South Africa	1	David Maree	1	S'Annara Grove
23 September	South Africa	2	Wynand Hofmeyr	2	Ainsli de Beer
23 September	South Africa	3	Carl Bonthuys	3	Michaela Lubbe
27–29 September 2023 (2023 Edition)	Romania; Plovdiv (Bulgaria)	1	Daniel Crista	1	
27–29 September 2023 (2023 Edition)	Romania; Plovdiv (Bulgaria)	2	Valentin Pleșea	2	
27–29 September 2023 (2023 Edition)	Romania; Plovdiv (Bulgaria)	3	Edvard Novak	3	
29 September – 8 October 2023	Costa Rica	1	Jordan Rodríguez Arias	1	Valeria Badilla
29 September – 8 October 2023	Costa Rica	2	Jefry Jiménez	2	
29 September – 8 October 2023	Costa Rica	3	Berny Sánchez	3	
4–8 October	Argentina	1	Rubén Ramos	1	Maribel Aguirre
4–8 October	Argentina	2	Kevin Castro	2	Cristina Irma Greve
4–8 October	Argentina	3	Daniel Juárez	3	Ludmila Ángela Aguirre
7–8 October	Austria	1	Maximilian Schmidbauer	1	Leila Gschwentner
7–8 October	Austria	2	Tim Wafler	2	Verena Eberhardt
7–8 October	Austria	3	Alexander Hajek	3	Anja Vogl
13–15 October	Bulgaria	1	Martin Papanov	1	
13–15 October	Bulgaria	2	Nikolay Genov	2	
13–15 October	Bulgaria	3	Petar Dimitrov	3	
21 October	Slovenia	1	Jaka Špoljar	1	
21 October	Slovenia	2	Mihael Štajnar	2	
21 October	Slovenia	3	Grega Podlesnik	3	
10–11 November	Belgium	1	Lindsay De Vylder	1	Lotte Kopecky
10–11 November	Belgium	2	Fabio Van den Bossche	2	Lani Wittevrongel
10–11 November	Belgium	3	Milan Van den Haute	3	Katrijn De Clercq
26 November	Netherlands	1	Elmar Abma	1	Juliet Eickhof
26 November	Netherlands	2	Sten Verzijl	2	Nienke Veenhoven
26 November	Netherlands	3	Rik Van Der Wal	3	Lisa van Belle
30 November – 4 December	India	1	Harshveer Sekhon	1	Meenakshi Rohilla
30 November – 4 December	India	2	Dinesh Kumar	2	Chayanika Gogoi
30 November – 4 December	India	3	Neeraj Kumar	3	Himanshi Singh
3 December	Malaysia	1		1	
3 December	Malaysia	2		2	
3 December	Malaysia	3		3	
8–10 December	Chile	1	Jacob Decar	1	Paula Villalón
8–10 December	Chile	2	Josafat Cárdenas	2	Scarlet Cortés
8–10 December	Chile	3	Alejandro Morales Álvarez	3	Aranza Villalón
8–10 December	Denmark	1	Tobias Hansen	1	Ida Fialla
8–10 December	Denmark	2	Lasse Norman Leth	2	Anika Rasmussen
8–10 December	Denmark	3	Conrad Haugsted	3	Anna Margrethe Hansen
8–10 December	Indonesia	1	Bernard Van Aert	1	Ayustina Delia Priatna
8–10 December	Indonesia	2	Muhammad Royan	2	Farrenty Putri
8–10 December	Indonesia	3	Terry Yudha Kusuma	3	Imelda Tabita Deswari Putri
9–11 December	Czech Republic	1	Adam Křenek	1	Jarmila Machačová
9–11 December	Czech Republic	2	Radovan Štec	2	Kateřina Kohoutková
9–11 December	Czech Republic	3	Matyáš Koblížek	3	Barbora Němcová
10 December	Norway	1	Kristoffer Forus	1	Anita Stenberg
10 December	Norway	2	Iver Knotten	2	Nora Tveit
10 December	Norway	3	Simen Evertsen-Hegreberg	3	
10 December	Sweden	1	Gustav Johansson	1	
10 December	Sweden	2	Hugo Porath	2	
10 December	Sweden	3	Neo Viking	3	
15–16 December	Australia	1	Graeme Frislie	1	Georgia Baker
15–16 December	Australia	2	Liam Walsh	2	Sophie Edwards
15–16 December	Australia	3	Kurt Eather	3	Alexandra Manly
15–17 December	Germany	1	Tim Torn Teutenberg	1	Seana Littbarski-Gray
15–17 December	Germany	2	Max Briese	2	Fabienne Jährig
15–17 December	Germany	3	Benjamin Boos	3	Lena Charlotte Reißner

=== Madison ===
Date	Venue	Podium (Men)		Podium (Women)	
11–12 November 2022 (Men)	United States; Detroit	1	Tristan Manderfeld; Colby Lange	1	
11–12 November 2022 (Men)	United States; Detroit	2	Ryan Jastrab; Eddy Huntsman	2	
11–12 November 2022 (Men)	United States; Detroit	3	Daniel Breuer; Lance Abshire	3	
4 December 2022	Malaysia; Nilai	1	Abdul Azim Aliyas; Zulhelmi Zainal	1	Nur Aisyah Mohamad Zubir; Ci Hui Nyo
4 December 2022	Malaysia; Nilai	2	Nur Aiman Rosli; Chun Kiat Lim	2	Siti Nur Adibah Akma Mohd Fuad; Noor Mastura Norman
4 December 2022	Malaysia; Nilai	3	Mior Hamzah; Muhammad Yusri Shaari	3	
9–11 December 2022	Indonesia; Surakarta	1	Dealton Prayogo; Terry Yudha Kusuma	1	
9–11 December 2022	Indonesia; Surakarta	2	Adhithia Alung; Bernard Van Aert	2	
9–11 December 2022	Indonesia; Surakarta	3	Roy Aldrie; Yosandy Oetomo	3	
16–18 December 2022	New Zealand; Cambridge	1	Tom Sexton; Campbell Stewart	1	Bryony Botha; Michaela Drummond
16–18 December 2022	New Zealand; Cambridge	2	George Jackson; Corbin Strong	2	Jessie Hodges; Ally Wollaston
16–18 December 2022	New Zealand; Cambridge	3	Matt Davies; Edward Pawson	3	Sami Donnelly; Ella Wyllie
17 December 2022	Australia; Melbourne	1	Kelland O'Brien; Graeme Frislie	1	Alexandra Manly; Georgia Baker
17 December 2022	Australia; Melbourne	2	Oliver Bleddyn; Blake Agnoletto	2	Chloe Moran; Lauren Perry
17 December 2022	Australia; Melbourne	3	Joshua Duffy; Kurt Eather	3	Alli Anderson; Alyssa Polites
27–29 December 2022	Netherlands; Apeldoorn	1	Philip Heijnen; Matthijs Büchli	1	Lorena Wiebes; Marit Raaijmakers
27–29 December 2022	Netherlands; Apeldoorn	2	Casper van Uden; Yanne Dorenbos	2	Charlotte Eickhof; Mylène de Zoete
27–29 December 2022	Netherlands; Apeldoorn	3	Justus Willemsen; Elmar Abma	3	Nina Kessler; Marjolein van 't Geloof
28–31 December 2022	China; Changxing County	1	Wu Junjie; Haojun Hu	1	Liu Jiali; Yuan Cao
28–31 December 2022	China; Changxing County	2	(Hong Kong) Tsun Wai Chu (Hong Kong) Leung Chun Wing	2	(Hong Kong) Leung Bo Yee (Hong Kong) Lee Sze Wing
28–31 December 2022	China; Changxing County	3	Wentao Sun; Yuanfeng Yu	3	Siqi Guan; Siyu Guan
5 January 2023	France; Roubaix	1	Thomas Boudat; Valentin Tabellion	1	Valentine Fortin; Victoire Berteau
5 January 2023	France; Roubaix	2	Quentin Lafargue; Donavan Grondin	2	Marie Le Net; Maryanne Hinault
5 January 2023	France; Roubaix	3	Dorian Carreau; Benjamin Thomas	3	Jade Labastugue; Aurore Pernollet
6–8 January 2023	Canada; Milton	1	Dylan Bibic; Mathias Guillemette	1	Lily Plante; Ariane Bonhomme
6–8 January 2023	Canada; Milton	2	Chris Ernst; Evan Burtnik	2	Erin Attwell; Devaney Collier
6–8 January 2023	Canada; Milton	3	Philippe Jacob; Tristan Jussaume	3	Kaitlyn Rauwerda; Klara Lylyk
15 January 2023	Portugal; Anadia	1	Rui Oliveira; Ivo Oliveira	1	
15 January 2023	Portugal; Anadia	2	Iúri Leitão; João Matias	2	
15 January 2023	Portugal; Anadia	3	Diogo Narciso; Rodrigo Caixas	3	
28 January 2023	Belgium; Ghent	1	Tuur Dens; Jules Hesters	1	Shari Bossuyt; Lotte Kopecky
28 January 2023	Belgium; Ghent	2	Lindsay De Vylder; Jasper Bertels	2	Katrijn De Clercq; Sara Maes
28 January 2023	Belgium; Ghent	3	Gianluca Pollefliet; Noah Vandenbranden	3	Hélène Hesters; Marith Vanhove
10 February 2023	Mexico; Guadalajara	1	Ramón Muñiz; Edibaldo Maldonado	1	Yareli Acevedo; Victoria Velasco
10 February 2023	Mexico; Guadalajara	2	Ignacio Prado; Ulises Alfredo Castillo	2	Jessica Bonilla; Lizbeth Salazar
10 February 2023	Mexico; Guadalajara	3	Tomas Aguirre; Salvador Lemus Guerrero	3	María Gaxiola; Mariana Valadez
8–12 March 2023	Brazil; Indaiatuba	1	Armando Camargo Filho; Luan Carlos Rodrigues	1	Alice Leite; Wellyda Rodrigues
8–12 March 2023	Brazil; Indaiatuba	2	Kacio Fonseca; Otavio Gonzeli	2	Gabriela de Costa; Talita Oliveira
8–12 March 2023	Brazil; Indaiatuba	3	Fábio Dalamaria; Ricardo Dalamaria	3	Amanda Kunkel; Ana Paula Cassetta
17–19 March 2023	Ecuador; Quito	1	Brayan Obando; David Villareal	1	
17–19 March 2023	Ecuador; Quito	2	Erik Daniel Caiza; Juan Manuel Pérez	2	
17–19 March 2023	Ecuador; Quito	3	Franklin Joel Revelo; Alejandro Pita Hidrobo	3	
22–24 March 2023	Israel; Tel Aviv	1	Amit Keinan; Alon Yogev	1	
22–24 March 2023	Israel; Tel Aviv	2	Rotem Tene; Oron Argov	2	
22–24 March 2023	Israel; Tel Aviv	3	Vladyslav Loginov; Eilam Wallach	3	
26 March 2023	Spain; Palma de Mallorca	1	Sebastián Mora; Iker Bonillo	1	Lucía García; Laura Rodríguez
26 March 2023	Spain; Palma de Mallorca	2	Mario Anguela; Álvaro Navas	2	Ainhoa Moreno; Marga López
26 March 2023	Spain; Palma de Mallorca	3	José Segura; Alejandro Merenciano	3	Eva Anguela; Isabella Escalera
4–8 April	Uzbekistan; Namangan	1	Danil Evdokimov; Dmitriy Bocharov	1	Olga Zabelinskaya; Margarita Misyurina
4–8 April	Uzbekistan; Namangan	2	Edem Eminov; Aleksey Fomovskiy	2	Ekaterina Knebeleva; Nafosat Kozieva
4–8 April	Uzbekistan; Namangan	3	Vladislav Troman; Davirjan Abdurakhmanov	2	Evgeniya Golotina; Madina Kakhkhorova
8–12 April	Kazakhstan; Astana	1	Sergey Karmazhakov; Ramis Dinmukhametov	1	Bota Batyrbekova; Akpeiil Ossim
8–12 April	Kazakhstan; Astana	2	Igor Yussifov; Assylkhan Turar	2	Anzhela Solovyeva; Elvira Khamzina
8–12 April	Kazakhstan; Astana	3	Maxim Khoroshavin; Ilya Karabutov	3	Yelena Mandrakova; Marina Kurnossova
28–30 April	Bolivia; La Paz	1		1	
28–30 April	Bolivia; La Paz	2		2	
28–30 April	Bolivia; La Paz	3		3	
12 May	Japan; Shizuoka	1	Kazushige Kuboki; Shunsuke Imamura	1	Yumi Kajihara; Mizuki Ikeda
12 May	Japan; Shizuoka	2	Toranosuke Yamashita; Eiya Hashimoto	2	Maho Kakita; Tsuyaka Uchino
12 May	Japan; Shizuoka	3	Shoi Matsuda; Shoki Khono	3	Tomomi Shimizu; Nao Itsumida
5 June	Ukraine; Lviv	1	Maksym Vasilyev; Roman Gladysh	1	Tetyana Klimchenko; Arina Korotieieva
5 June	Ukraine; Lviv	2	Yaroslav Kozakov; Matvey Ushakov	2	Yuliia Skoryschenko; Anna Kolyzhuk
5 June	Ukraine; Lviv	3	Vladyslav Shcherban; Yurii Shcherban	3	Maryna Ivaniuk; Iryna Shymanska
14–18 June	Germany; Cottbus	1	Moritz Malcharek; Moritz Augenstein	1	Franziska Brauße; Lea Lin Teutenberg
14–18 June	Germany; Cottbus	2	Theo Reinhardt; Roger Kluge	2	Hanna Dopjans; Lena Charlotte Reißner
14–18 June	Germany; Cottbus	3	Nicolas Zippan; Malte Maschke	3	Justyna Czapla; Marla Sigmund
27–29 June	Italy; Fiorenzuola d'Arda	1	Francesco Lamon; Michele Scartezzini	1	Martina Alzini; Martina Fidanza
27–29 June	Italy; Fiorenzuola d'Arda	2	Niccolò Galli; Mattia Pinazzi	2	Valentina Scandolara; Sara Fiorin
27–29 June	Italy; Fiorenzuola d'Arda	3	Matteo Donegà; Elia Viviani	3	Elena Bissolati; Lara Crestanello
1–5 July	South Korea; Yangyang County	1	Hun Jang; Park Sang-hoon	1	Park Soo-bin; Lee Ha-ran
1–5 July	South Korea; Yangyang County	2	Park Keon-woo; Kim Eu-ro	2	Kim Hyun-ji; Kim You-ri
1–5 July	South Korea; Yangyang County	3	Shin Dong-in; Bae Seung-bin	3	Shin Ji-eun; Kim Min-jung
20–23 July	Colombia	1	Juan Arango; Weimar Roldán	1	Elizabeth Castaño; Lina Hernández
20–23 July	Colombia	2	Kevin Castillo; Santiago Ramírez	2	Kimberly Escobar; Marynes Prada
20–23 July	Colombia	3	Yeison Chaparro; Diego Ochoa	3	Diana Corrales; Carolina Valencia
23–24 July	Chinese Taipei; Taichung	1	Dong Ling Lee; En Chieh Liu	1	
23–24 July	Chinese Taipei; Taichung	2	Chih Sheng Chang; Shi Ru Xu	2	
23–24 July	Chinese Taipei; Taichung	3	Meng Hsun Shen; Chung Ling Li	3	
28–30 July	Greece; Athens	1	Christos Volikakis; Ioannis Kyriakidis	1	
28–30 July	Greece; Athens	2	Georgios Boutopoulos; Stefanos Klokas	2	
28–30 July	Greece; Athens	3	Nikiforos Arvanitou; Georgios Stefanakis	3	
26–27 August	Ireland	1	Chris Donald; Stefan Caulfield-Dreier	1	Annalise Murphy; Ellen Ni Cleirigh
26–27 August	Ireland	2	Jason Kenny; Sean Landers	2	Clodagh Ní Ghallchóir; Jennifer Neenan
26–27 August	Ireland	3	Conor Murnane; Michael Browne	3	Helen McParland; Jennifer Bates
15–17 September	Poland	1	Wojciech Pszczolarski; Filip Prokopyszyn	1	Tamara Szalińska; Nikol Płosaj
15–17 September	Poland	2	Radosław Frątczak; Piotr Maslak	2	Wiktoria Pikulik; Olga Wankiewicz
15–17 September	Poland	3	Adam Woźniak; Konrad Waliniak	3	Oliwia Majewska; Zofia Jakubowska
23 September	Czech Republic	1		1	Kateřina Kohoutková; Petra Ševčíková
23 September	Czech Republic	2		2	Veronika Bartoníková; Gabriela Bártová
23 September	Czech Republic	3		3	Hanka Runtová; Hana Heřmanovská
23 September	Switzerland	1	Simon Vitzthum; Claudio Imhof	1	
23 September	Switzerland	2	Alex Vogel; Emanuel Wüthrich	2	
23 September	Switzerland	3	Matteo Constant; Damien Fortis	3	
4–8 October	Argentina	1	Rubén Ramos; Rodrigo Daniel Díaz	1	
4–8 October	Argentina	2	Agustín Ferrari; Tomás Eloy Moyano	2	
4–8 October	Argentina	3	Marcos Leon Rodríguez; Hugo Velázquez	3	
7–8 October	Austria	1	Maximilian Schmidbauer; Raphael Kokas	1	
7–8 October	Austria	2	Alexander Hajek; Tim Wafler	2	
7–8 October	Austria	3	Christian Kromoser; Heimo Fugger	3	
13–15 October	Bulgaria	1	Martin Papanov; Petar Dimitrov	1	
13–15 October	Bulgaria	2	Ventsislav Venkov; Martin Popov	2	
13–15 October	Bulgaria	3	Yordan Petrov; Georgi Lumparov	3	
22 October	Slovenia	1	Erazem Valjavec; Žak Eržen	1	
22 October	Slovenia	2	Domen Oblak; Tine Jenko	2	
22 October	Slovenia	3	Mark Poberaj; Luka Ziherl	3	
10–11 November (Men's); 22–23 December (Women's)	Belgium	1	Lindsay De Vylder; Robbe Ghys	1	Hélène Hesters; Katrijn De Clercq
10–11 November (Men's); 22–23 December (Women's)	Belgium	2	Noah Vandenbranden; Gianluca Pollefliet	2	Lani Wittevrongel; Marith Vanhove
10–11 November (Men's); 22–23 December (Women's)	Belgium	3	Fabio Van den Bossche; Jonas Rickaert	3	Sara Maes; Luca Vierstraete
8–10 December	Denmark	1	Lasse Norman Leth; Theodor Storm	1	Ida Fialla; Amalie Winther Olsen
8–10 December	Denmark	2	Robin Juel Skivild; Tobias Hansen	2	Anika Rasmussen; Anna Margrethe Hansen
8–10 December	Denmark	3	Conrad Haugsted; Julius Johansen	3	Ida Krickau Ketelsen; Mathilde Cramer
2 December	Malaysia	1	Abdul Azim Aliyas; Zulhelmi Zainal	1	
2 December	Malaysia	2	Yong Kiat Khow; Hung Chiat Maximillian Fong	2	
2 December	Malaysia	3	New Joe Lau; Muhammad Hafiq Mohd Jafri	3	
9–11 December	Czech Republic	1	Jan Voneš; Denis Rugovac	1	
9–11 December	Czech Republic	2	Matyáš Koblížek; Radovan Štec	2	
9–11 December	Czech Republic	3	Tomáš Bárta; Daniel Babor	3	
8–10 December	Indonesia	1	Muhammad Royan; Bernard Van Aert	1	
8–10 December	Indonesia	2	Terry Yudha Kusuma; Yosandy Darmawan Oetomo	2	
8–10 December	Indonesia	3	Syarif Hidayatullah; Muhammad Syelhan Nurahmat	3	
15–16 December	Australia	1	Kelland O'Brien; Blake Agnoletto	1	Georgia Baker; Alexandra Manly
15–16 December	Australia	2	Graeme Frislie; Liam Walsh	2	Sophie Marr; Keira Will
15–16 December	Australia	3	Conor Leahy; Wil Holmes	3	Sophie Edwards; Sally Carter
29 December	Netherlands	1	Elmar Abma; Yanne Dorenbos	1	
29 December	Netherlands	2	Yoeri Havik; Jan-Willem van Schip	2	
29 December	Netherlands	3	Philip Heijnen; Vincent Hoppezak	3	

=== Team Sprint ===
Date	Venue	Podium (Men)		Podium (Women)	
17–20 November 2022	Romania; Plovdiv (Bulgaria)	1	Daniel Crista; Valentin Plesea; Emil Dima	1	
17–20 November 2022	Romania; Plovdiv (Bulgaria)	2	Mihai Băbăiță; Emil Chepetan; Alin Toader	2	
17–20 November 2022	Romania; Plovdiv (Bulgaria)	3		3	
9–11 December 2022	Norway; Sola	1	Aasmund Groven Lindtveit; Sebastian Kartfjord; Frode Svortevik Birkeland	1	
9–11 December 2022	Norway; Sola	2		2	
9–11 December 2022	Norway; Sola	3		3	
10–11 December 2022	Chile; Santiago	1	Joaquín Fuenzalida; Diego Fuenzalida; Mariano Lecaros	1	Paulina Pontillo González; Sofía Huerta Calderón; Leonor Espinosa
10–11 December 2022	Chile; Santiago	2	Nicolás Chacón; Alejandro Morales; Ricardo Paredes Arancibia	2	
10–11 December 2022	Chile; Santiago	3	Christopher Ponce Mejías; Daniel Bretti; Nicolas Ignacio Vergara	3	
10–14 December 2022	India; Guwahati	1	Esow Alben; David Beckham Elkathchoongo; Paul Collingwood; Arkaprava Baul	1	Triyasha Paul; M Sonali Chanu; Alena Reji
10–14 December 2022	India; Guwahati	2	Ronaldo Laitonjam; Yanglem Rojit Singh; Amarjeet Singh Nagi; Ranjit Singh	2	Aditi Dongare; Shushikala Agashe; Mayuri Lute
10–14 December 2022	India; Guwahati	3	Thangsabam Chinglensana Meitei; Khwairakpam Rahul; Jemsh Singh Keithellakpam	3	Deborah Herold; Nisha Nikita; Celestina Chelobroy
28–31 December 2022	China; Changxing County	1	Xudong Zhang; Shuai Guo; Chenxi Xue	1	Fei Zhou; Yulu Jiang; Chen Feifei
28–31 December 2022	China; Changxing County	2	Huang Yijun; Kai Gao; Zhiwei Li	2	Qi Lei; Luo Jing; Zhai Fei
28–31 December 2022	China; Changxing County	3	Xinjie Yin; Jincheng Xie; Yiming Li	3	Siqing Liang; Li Yingxin; Sisi Huang
6–8 January 2023	Canada; Milton	1	Tyler Rorke; Nick Wammes; James Hedgcock	1	Emy Savard; Jackie Boyle; Sarah Orban
6–8 January 2023	Canada; Milton	2	Alex Brugger; Ryan Macdonald; Dustin Brooks	2	Erin Watchman; Erica Rieder; Kelsey Mitchell
6–8 January 2023	Canada; Milton	3		3	Anne-Marie Dumont; Parmis Rabet; Annie Scott
26–29 January 2023	United Kingdom; Newport	1	Marcus Hiley; Harry Ledingham-Horn; Ed Lowe	1	Emma Finucane; Katy Marchant; Milly Tanner
26–29 January 2023	United Kingdom; Newport	2	Matt Rotherham; James Bunting; Hayden Norris; Oliver Aloul	2	Sophie Capewell; Blaine Ridge-Davis; Lowri Thomas
26–29 January 2023	United Kingdom; Newport	3	Lyall Craig; Luthias Arthur; Niall Monks	3	Lauren Bell; Iona Moir; Ellie Stone
7 February 2023	Mexico; Guadalajara	1	Edgar Verdugo; Juan Carlos Ruíz Terán; Gadiel Antonio Hernández; Sebastián Ruiz Terán	1	María José Vizcaíno; Daniela Gaxiola; Jessica Salazar
7 February 2023	Mexico; Guadalajara	2	Felipe de Jesus Ramírez Soria; Jafet Emmanuel López Gonzaga; Jesús Daniel García Reyes	2	Andrea Ortiz; Melanie Ramírez; Vanessa González Sánchez; Yuli Verdugo
7 February 2023	Mexico; Guadalajara	3	Ricardo Peña Salas; Alfredo Rodríguez; Kevin Velarde	3	
1–5 March 2023	New Zealand; Invercargill	1	Jaxson Russell; Liam Cavanagh; Reuben Webster	1	Mya Anderson; Amelia Sykes; Ciara Kelly
1–5 March 2023	New Zealand; Invercargill	2	Daniel Shepherd; Jared Mann; Kaio Lart	2	Jessica Spencer; Geertien Venter; Nicole Marshall
1–5 March 2023	New Zealand; Invercargill	3	Ronan Shearing; Charles Tinoai; Connor Douglas	3	Sophie de Vries; Samantha Walker; Alana Breen
8–12 March 2023	Brazil; Indaiatuba	1	João Vitor da Silva; Daniel Henrique Gruer de Brito; Mauro Aquino	1	Carolina Barbosa Alves do Nascimento; Lutécia Masotti; Tatielle Valadares
8–12 March 2023	Brazil; Indaiatuba	2	Fernando Sikora Júnior; Geovane Vinicius Ferreira; Gustavo de Oliveira da Silva	2	Amanda Kunkel; Ana Paula Casetta; Gabriela Yumi
8–12 March 2023	Brazil; Indaiatuba	3	Matheus Henrique Almeida Fudisaki; Leandro Larmelina; Franklin Gomes de Almeida	3	Ana Paula Finco; Patricia Mayara Busto; Sumaia Ali dos Santos Ribeiro
17–19 March 2023	Ecuador; Quito	1	Francisco Nazareno; Kevin Preciado; Allan Alban	1	Génesis Tarira; Ruth Rendon; Patricia Chala
17–19 March 2023	Ecuador; Quito	2	Josue Nuñez; Steven Valencia; Marco Paredez	2	
17–19 March 2023	Ecuador; Quito	3		3	
18 March 2023	Australia; Brisbane	1	Maxwell Liebeknecht; Leigh Hoffman; James Brister	1	Molly McGill; Kristina Clonan; Jacqui Mengler-Mohr
18 March 2023	Australia; Brisbane	2	Nathan Graves; Ryan Elliott; Byron Davies	2	Tomansin Clark; Kalinda Robinson; Eliza Bennett
18 March 2023	Australia; Brisbane	3	John Trovas; Daniel Barber; Thomas Cornish	3	Ella Sibley; Breanna Hargrave; Chloe Moran
4–8 April	Uzbekistan; Namangan	1	Akbar Xikmatov; Samandar Janikulov; Sanjarbek Ergashev	1	Sabina Zaxidova; Anastasya Safonova; Diana Irmatova
4–8 April	Uzbekistan; Namangan	2	Eldar Valeev; Avazbek Kamolov; Abdullo Valiev	2	Madina Kakhkhorova; Sevinch Yuldasheva; Evgeniya Golotina
4–8 April	Uzbekistan; Namangan	3	Yevgeniy Dmitriyenko; Asadbek Eshankulov; Timur Abdukhakimov	3	
5 April	South Africa; Cape Town	1	Jean Spies; James Swart; Matthew Lester	1	Sunique van der Walt; Amber Hindmarch; Michaela Lubbe
5 April	South Africa; Cape Town	2	Tshila Munyai; Doug Abbot; Wikus Myburg	2	
5 April	South Africa; Cape Town	3	Graeme Ockhuis; Alex Goetham; Joshua Louw	3	
8–12 April	Kazakhstan; Astana	1	Vyacheslav Sichkarev; Ramis Dinmukhametov; Mukhammedamin Amirkhan; Dmitriy Rezanov	1	Svetlana Pachshenko; Akpeiil Ossim; Faina Potapova
8–12 April	Kazakhstan; Astana	2	Sergey Ponomaryov; Viktor Golov; Sultanmurat Miraliyev	2	Yelena Mandrakova; Marina Kurnossova; Amina Orazbayeva
8–12 April	Kazakhstan; Astana	3	Maxim Khoroshavin; Ilya Karabutov; Andrey Kreis; Kirill Kurdidi	3	Veronika Myrxina; Bota Batyrbekova; Violetta Kazakova
28–30 April	Bolivia; La Paz	1	Sebastián Mena; José Manuel Aramayo; Mateo Saravia Alanes; Joaquín Siles Cohello	1	Elizabeth Vásquez Avila; Kenia Karina Almanza Choré; Brenda Saavedra Zurita
28–30 April	Bolivia; La Paz	2		2	
28–30 April	Bolivia; La Paz	3		3	
5 May	Trinidad and Tobago; Couva	1	Kyle Caraby; Devante Laurence; Ryan D'Abreau	1	
5 May	Trinidad and Tobago; Couva	2		2	
5 May	Trinidad and Tobago; Couva	3		3	
11 May	Japan; Shizuoka	1	Kohei Terasaki; Yuta Obara; Kaiya Ota	1	Honoka Toshimi; Riko Kawamoto; Mio Nakanishi
11 May	Japan; Shizuoka	2	Ryoya Mikami; Ryuma Henmi; Kyosuke Ito	2	Tomomi Shimizu; Akiyo Suzuki; Nao Itsumida
11 May	Japan; Shizuoka	3	Yuta Wakimoto; Kyohei Shinzan; Yoshitaku Nagasako	3	Yumi Hamaguchi; Suzuka Aimi; Hikaru Tanaka
15–19 May	Malaysia; Nilai	1	Muhammad Ridwan Sahrom; Mohd Akmal Nazimi Jusena; Muhammad Nabil Wafiq Zamri	1	Nurul Izzah Izzati Mohd Asri; Nurul Nabilah Mohd Asri; Phi Kun Pan
15–19 May	Malaysia; Nilai	2	Yong Kiat Khow; Muhammad Luqman Daniel Mohammad Roji; Maximillian Fong Hung Chiat	2	
15–19 May	Malaysia; Nilai	3	Ahmad Safwan Ahmad Nazeri; Nadzrul Hafidzy Mohd Hafidz; Mohamad Zakwan Hamidon	3	
19–20 May	Jamaica; Kingston	1	Duwayne Douglas; Bradley McFarlane; Daniel Palmer	1	
19–20 May	Jamaica; Kingston	2	Rasheik Bailey; Horace McFarlane; Andrew Ramsay	2	
19–20 May	Jamaica; Kingston	3	Issa Hibbert; Mark Henry; Jerome Forrest	3	
4 June	Ukraine; Lviv	1	Ostap Sulkovskyi; Bohdan Danylchuk; Yehor Korobov; Vladyslav Denysenko	1	Olena Starikova; Alla Biletska; Oleksandra Lohviniuk
4 June	Ukraine; Lviv	2	Valentin Vargarakin; Andriy Bilogub; Mykhailo-Yaroslav Dudko	2	Sofia Kovtun; Elizaveta Mohyr; Karolina Kelyukh
4 June	Ukraine; Lviv	3	Andrii Nizelskyi; Yurii Korzinin; Oleksandr Smetanyuk; Andriy Zozulya	3	Yuliia Pankiv; Yuliia Skoryschenko; Anna Kolyzhuk; Viktoriya Bondar
9–11 June	Spain; Valencia	1	David Ramón Ramos; David Lucas; Alejandro Martínez	1	Marta Vilanova Calmaestra; Laura Rodríguez Cordero; Helena Casas
9–11 June	Spain; Valencia	2	Itmar Esteban Herraiz; Gerard García Gómez; Manel Usach Sancho	2	Isabella Escalera; Almudena Morales; Eva Anguela
9–11 June	Spain; Valencia	3	Carlos López Aroca; Francisco Javier Perona Ogallar; José Moreno Sánchez	3	Goretti Sesma; Amaia Esparza; Saioa Orgambide
1–5 June 2023	China; Hangzhou (2023 Edition)	1	Jin Zhiheng; Yu Zhou; Xu Chao	1	Bao Shanju; Yuan Liying; Guo Yufang
1–5 June 2023	China; Hangzhou (2023 Edition)	2	Guo Shuai; Chenxi Xue; Liu Haotong	2	Fan Bingbing; Jiang Yulu; Chen Feifei
1–5 June 2023	China; Hangzhou (2023 Edition)	3	Zewei Zhan; Jiacheng Lu; Jie Lv	3	Qi Lei; Fei Zhai; Xuehuang Luo
14–18 June	Germany; Cottbus	1	Nik Schröter; Maximilian Dörnbach; Anton Höhne	1	Lea Friedrich; Pauline Grabosch; Emma Hinze
14–18 June	Germany; Cottbus	2	Willy Weinrich; Julien Jäger; Paul Schippert; Marc Jurczyk	2	Sandra Hainzl; Alessa-Catriona Pröpster; Lara-Sophie Jäger
14–18 June	Germany; Cottbus	3	Timo Bichler; Luca Spiegel; Henric Hackmann	3	Lea Lin Teutenberg; Franziska Brauße; Lana Eberle
27–29 June	Italy; Fiorenzuola d'Arda	1	Francesco Lamon; Davide Boscaro; Stefano Moro	1	Martina Alzini; Valentina Scandolara; Miriam Vece; Giada Capobianchi
27–29 June	Italy; Fiorenzuola d'Arda	2	Stefano Minuta; Matteo Tugnolo; Daniele Napolitano; Matteo Bianchi	2	Elena Bissolati; Martina Fidanza; Carola Ratti; Sara Fiorin
27–29 June	Italy; Fiorenzuola d'Arda	3	Michael Cattani; Bryan Olivo; Daniel Skerl	3	Beatrice Bertolini; Rebecca Vezzosi; Irene Oneda; Martina Puiatti
30 June – 2 July	Czech Republic; Brno	1	Dominik Topinka; Matěj Bohuslávek; Martin Čechman	1	Veronika Jaborníková; Anna Jaborníková; Natálie Mikšaníková
30 June – 2 July	Czech Republic; Brno	2	Jakub Šťastný; Robin Wagner; Tomáš Bábek	2	Sára Krochmaĺová; Michaela Poulová; Sára Peterková
30 June – 2 July	Czech Republic; Brno	3	Jakub Vajbar; Matěj Hytych; Jakub Malášek	3	Karolína Richterová; Patricie Müllerová; Veronika Jadrná
1–5 July	South Korea; Yangyang County	1	Lee Geon-min; Lee Jae-ho; Oh Je-seok	1	Kim Soo-hyun; Jang Eun-seol; Lee Hye-jin
1–5 July	South Korea; Yangyang County	2	Kim Geun-woo; Kim Min-jun; Im Sang-seop	1	Cho Sun-young; Kim Tae-nam; Kim Bo-mi
1–5 July	South Korea; Yangyang County	3	Kang Seo-jun; Yang Jin-sik; Park Jeong-jin	1	Hwang Hyeon-seo; Kim Su-vin; Kim Chae-yeon
5–9 July	United States; Carson	1	Evan Boone; Dalton Walters; Joshua Hartman; Jamie Alvord	1	Keely Ainslie; Kayla Hankins; McKenna McKee
5–9 July	United States; Carson	2	Nicholas Roberts; Geneway Tang; Andrew Chu; Finn Koller	2	Annika Flanigan; Mandy Marquardt; Divya Verma
5–9 July	United States; Carson	3	Calvin Lin; Alex Siegel; Corey Jameson; John Bowie	3	Emily Hayes; Sylese Christian; Mary Wintz
21–23 July	Colombia	1	Carlos Daniel Echeverry; Rubén Murillo; Juan David Ochoa	1	Martha Bayona; Juliana Gaviria; Yarli Mosquera
21–23 July	Colombia	2	Kevin Quintero; Juan Diego Arboleda; Samir Cambindo	2	Martha Ojeda; Sol Angie Roa; Marianis Salazar
21–23 July	Colombia	3	Miguel Ángel Jaramillo; Cristian Ortega; Francisco Jaramillo	3	Valeria Cardozo; Natalia Martínez; María Juliana Jaramillo
23–24 July	Chinese Taipei; Taichung	1	Shih Hsin Hsiao; Sheng Kai Yang; Shi Ru Xu	1	
23–24 July	Chinese Taipei; Taichung	2	Tsai Chia Hsun; Ching Lun Huang; Chen Chien-liang	2	
23–24 July	Chinese Taipei; Taichung	3	Dong Ling Lee; En Chieh Liu; Yong Jie Huang	3	
27 July	Finland	1	Kalle Toivanen; Mika Simola; Juuso Salminen	1	Sini Savolainen; Iisa Lepistö; Jaana Hyvärinen
27 July	Finland	2	Wille Riihelä; Pauli Putkonen; Juhani Tammisto	2	
27 July	Finland	3	Reijo Kähäri; Juha Kettunen; Harri Rajaniemi	3	
28–30 July	Greece; Athens	1	Christos Tserentzoulias; Theocharis Tsiantos; Christos Volikakis	1	Aikaterini Chatzistefani; Eirini Maria Karousou; Ioanna Plega-Gavrilaki
28–30 July	Greece; Athens	2	Miltiadis Charovas; Kyriakos Papastamatakis; Stamatios Savvakis	2	Elena Koutsoukou; Aikaterini Panagiotakopoulou; Despina Tourli
28–30 July	Greece; Athens	3	Konstantinos Livanos; Panagiotis Panagaris; Ioannis Panigyrakis	3	
5 August	Ireland; Dublin	1	Dmitri Griffin; Callum O'Toole; Fionn Sheridan	1	Autumn Collins; Deirbhle Ivory; Nikki Taggart
5 August	Ireland; Dublin	2	Alexander Abdul-Wahab; Eric Gasparro; Ryan O'Neal	2	Helen McParland; Annalise Murphy; Ellen Ní Cléirigh
5 August	Ireland; Dublin	3	Harvey Barnes; James Glasgow; Kyle Glasgow	3	Sofie Loscher; Susie Mitchell; Claire Ní Reachtagáin
15–17 September	Poland	1	Mateusz Rudyk; Rafał Sarnecki; Tomasz Dobrzyński	1	Urszula Łoś; Natalia Walecka; Nikola Jankowska
15–17 September	Poland	2	Tomasz Łamaszewski; Julian Gabrusewicz; Lucjan Nowicki	2	Paulina Petri; Maria Klamut; Matylda Głowacka
15–17 September	Poland	3	Konrad Burawski; Maciej Bielecki; Marcin Marciniak	3	Marlena Karwacka; Natalia Kaczmarczyk; Sandra Schulz
15–17 September	Thailand	1	Pongthep Tapimay; Worayut Kapunya; Satjakul Sianglam	1	
15–17 September	Thailand	2	Nitirut Kitphiriyakan; Kanok Chumbuathong; Aukkrit Nomai; Sornwisit Saikrasunta	2	
15–17 September	Thailand	3	Orrachun Petcharat; Yeaunyong Petcharat; Chiraphong Phaksriwong; Nuttakrit Chanpratad	3	
27–29 September 2023 (2023 Edition)	Romania; Plovdiv (Bulgaria)	1	Ferenc-Dávid Szász; János Török; Edvard Novak	1	
27–29 September 2023 (2023 Edition)	Romania; Plovdiv (Bulgaria)	2	Alin Toader; Mihai Băbăiță; Andrei Ionuţ	2	
27–29 September 2023 (2023 Edition)	Romania; Plovdiv (Bulgaria)	3	Valentin Pleșea; Sebastian Mihai Paveliu; Csaba Bartha	3	
29 September – 8 October 2023	Costa Rica	1	Luis Murillo; Jefry Jiménez; Jordan Rodríguez	1	
29 September – 8 October 2023	Costa Rica	2		2	
29 September – 8 October 2023	Costa Rica	3		3	
4–8 October	Argentina	1		1	
4–8 October	Argentina	2		2	
4–8 October	Argentina	3		3	
13–15 October	Bulgaria	1	Hristo Gechev; Georgi Lumparov; Yordan Petrov	1	
13–15 October	Bulgaria	2	Todor Kozhuharov; Miroslav Minchev; Nikolay Stanchev	2	
13–15 October	Bulgaria	3	Ivelin Tsankov; Nikolay Dyankov; Kaloyan Naidenov	3	
20 October	Slovenia	1	Luka Ziherl; Jaka Vovk; Grega Podlesnik	1	
20 October	Slovenia	2	Andraž Skok; Bine Miškulin; Natan Gregorčič	2	
20 October	Slovenia	3	Leon Klopčič; Primož Kirbiš; Mihael Štajnar	3	
29 November – 3 December	Venezuela	1	Amaro Andres Gomez; Camilo Cesar Meza; Luis Yáñez	1	
29 November – 3 December	Venezuela	2	Andrew Johan Rojas; Máximo Rojas; Clever Martínez	2	
29 November – 3 December	Venezuela	3		3	
30 November – 4 December	India	1	Ronaldo Laitonjam; Warishdeep Singh; Yanglem Rojit Singh; Mayur Pawar	1	Deborah Herold; Nisha Nikita; Celestina Chelobroy
30 November – 4 December	India	2	David Elkatohchoongo; Esow Alben; Paul Collingwood	2	Yumnam Thaja Devi; Khoirom Rejiya Devi; Tongbram Monorama Devi
30 November – 4 December	India	3	Devendra Bishnoi; Luv Kumar Yadav; Ajay Pal Bishnoi; Vipul Bishnoi	3	Mayuri Dhanraj Lute; Triyasha Paul; Alena Reji

=== Team Pursuit ===
Date	Venue	Podium (Men)		Podium (Women)	
17–20 November 2022	Romania; Plovdiv (Bulgaria)	1	Daniel Crista; Valentin Plesea; Mihai Sebastian Paveliu; Emil Dima	1	
17–20 November 2022	Romania; Plovdiv (Bulgaria)	2	Mihai Băbăiță; Emil Chepetan; Mădălin Gaiță; Alin Toader	2	
17–20 November 2022	Romania; Plovdiv (Bulgaria)	3		3	
9–11 December 2022	Indonesia; Surakarta	1	Aiman Cahyadi; Odie Purnomo; Bernard Van Aert; Adhithia Alung	1	
9–11 December 2022	Indonesia; Surakarta	2	Dealton Prayogo; Terry Yudha; Roy Aldrie; Yosandy Oetomo	2	
9–11 December 2022	Indonesia; Surakarta	3	M. Beni Al; Shindu Ardiyanto; Pangga Sarwani; M. Ammar Taufiquroahman	3	
9–11 December 2022	Norway; Sola	1	Åge André Kolnes; Jon Petter Nordbø; Jone Ellingsen; Jim Daniels	1	
9–11 December 2022	Norway; Sola	2		2	
9–11 December 2022	Norway; Sola	3		3	
10–11 December 2022	Chile; Santiago	1	Felipe Peñaloza; Antonio Cabrera; Cristóbal Mena; Vicente Ramírez Gómez	1	
10–11 December 2022	Chile; Santiago	2	Cristóbal Lira; Manuel José Lira; Jacob Thomas Decar; Tomás Quiroz	2	
10–11 December 2022	Chile; Santiago	3	Cristián Arriagada; Matías Arriagada; Gonzalo Miranda; Luis Morales	3	
10–11 December 2022	Czech Republic; Prague	1	Milan Kadlec; Jan Voneš; Petr Vávra; Petr Fiala	1	
10–11 December 2022	Czech Republic; Prague	2	Ondřej Mazel; Ondřej Pokorný; Matyáš Koblížek; Radovan Štec	2	
10–11 December 2022	Czech Republic; Prague	3	Adam Venc; Viktor Padělek; Štěpán Široký; Michal Rotter	3	
10–14 December 2022	India; Guwahati	1	Vishavjeet Singh; Anil Manglaw; Rajbeer Singh; Naman Kapil; Venkappa Kengalagutti	1	Manorama Devi; Matouleibi Devi; Vaishnavi Gabne; Monika Jat; M Sonali Chanu
10–14 December 2022	India; Guwahati	2	Manjeet Singh; Dinesh Kumar; Mula Ram; Elangbam Lahchenba	2	Himanshi Singh; Meenakshi Rohilla; Mukul M Prabhjot Kaur
10–14 December 2022	India; Guwahati	3	Manish M Mukesh Kaswan; Birma Ram; Radha Kishan Godara; Vinod Gat	3	Chayanika Gogoi; Joyshree Gogoi; Gongutri Bordoloi; Rajashree Gogoi
28–31 December 2022	China; Changxing County	1	Zhang Haiao; Junjie Wu; Haojun Hu; Chuanyang Lin	1	Liu Jiali; Yuan Cao; Li Guo; Liping Luo
28–31 December 2022	China; Changxing County	2	Wentao Sun; Jinyang Ju; Yuanfeng Yu; Yongqi Yao	2	Siqi Guan; Siyu Guan; Lu Siying; Hongliang Zhang
28–31 December 2022	China; Changxing County	3	(Hong Kong) Wan Yau Lau (Hong Kong) Tsun Wai Chu (Hong Kong) Pak Hang Ng (Hong Kong) Leung Chun Wing	3	(Hong Kong) Yang Qianyu (Hong Kong) Leung Wing Yee (Hong Kong) Leung Bo Yee (Hong Kong) Lee Sze Wing
5 January 2023	France; Roubaix	1	Clément Cordenos; Thomas Boudat; Thomas Denis; Valentin Tabellion; Théo Bracke	1	Clémence Chereau; Léane Tabu; Jade Labastugue; Aurore Pernollet; Violette Demay
5 January 2023	France; Roubaix	2	Grégory Pouvreault; Guillaume Monmasson; Mathias Ribeiro Da Cruz; Florian Maitre	2	Marie Patouillet; Valentine Fortin; Lara Lallemant; Océane Tessier
5 January 2023	France; Roubaix	3	Maxime Dransart; Corentin Ermenault; Adrien Garel; Louis Pijourlet	3	Marie Le Net; Maurène Trégouët; Maryanne Hinault; Marie-Morgane Le Deunff
26–29 January 2023	United Kingdom; Newport	1	Josh Charlton; William Roberts; Charlie Tanfield; William Tidball	1	Ella Barnwell; Maddie Leech; Grace Lister; Jessica Roberts
26–29 January 2023	United Kingdom; Newport	2	Sebastian Garry; Michael Gill; William Perrett; Tom Ward	2	Sophie Lankford; Beth Maciver; Eilidh Shaw; Evie White
26–29 January 2023	United Kingdom; Newport	3	Alex Beldon; Matthew Brennan; Jed Smithson; Ben Wiggins	3	Lucy Glover; Marie Porton; Lowri Richards; Esther Wong
6 February 2023	Mexico; Guadalajara	1	Edibaldo Maldonado; Fernando Nava Romo; Ulises Castillo; Rene Corella	1	Yareli Acevedo; Nicole Córdova Guerra; Jessica Bonilla; María Gaxiola
6 February 2023	Mexico; Guadalajara	2	Ricardo Peña; Sebastián Ruiz Terán; Alfredo Rodríguez; Kevin Velarde	2	
6 February 2023	Mexico; Guadalajara	3	Emiliano Flores Matías; Álvaro Flores Gómez; Rodrigo Medina Morna; Hans Torres	3	
1–5 March 2023	New Zealand; Invercargill	1	Oliver Watson-Palmer; Lewis Johnston; Matt Davis; Maui Morrison	1	Amelia Sykes; Samantha Walker; Meghan Baker; Kirsty Watts
1–5 March 2023	New Zealand; Invercargill	2	Marshall Erwood; Tom Kerr; Magnus Jamieson; Jesse Willis	2	Belle Judd; Mya Wolfenden; Caitlin Kelly; Molly Hayes
1–5 March 2023	New Zealand; Invercargill	3	Edward Pawson; Christian Rush; Ed Sims; Bernard Pawson	3	
8–12 March 2023	Brazil; Indaiatuba	1	Armando Camargo; Endrigo Rosa Pereira; Luan Rodrigues Silva; Pedro Miguel Freitas de Oliveira; Maurício Knapp	1	Alice Melo; Cristiane Pereira Silva; Nicolle Borges; Wellyda Rodrigues
8–12 March 2023	Brazil; Indaiatuba	2	Lauro Chaman; Kacio Fonseca; Otávio Augusto Gonzeli; João Pedro Rossi; Rafael Augusto Braga	2	Gisele Gasparotto; Camila Ângulo; Lara Rodrigues; Victória Remaili
8–12 March 2023	Brazil; Indaiatuba	3	Fábio Dalamaria; Ricardo Dalamaria; Samuel Stachera; Diego de Jesus Mendes	3	Janildes Fernandes; Márcia Fernandes; Larissa Castelari; Lorena Lionço
17 March 2023	Australia; Brisbane	1		1	Alli Anderson; Nicola Macdonald; Chloe Moran; Ella Sibley
17 March 2023	Australia; Brisbane	2		2	
17 March 2023	Australia; Brisbane	3		3	
17–19 March 2023	Ecuador; Quito	1	Cristian Gutiérrez Pianda; Adonis Vivas Villarreal; Javier Viteri Paredes; Efrain Quishpe	1	
17–19 March 2023	Ecuador; Quito	2	Brayan Obando; Edwin Chafuelan; Jilmar Imbaquingo; David Villarreal	2	
17–19 March 2023	Ecuador; Quito	3	Wilson Haro; Cristian Pita; Lenin Montenegro; Jorge Luis Montenegro	3	
4–8 April	Uzbekistan; Namangan	1	Danil Evdokimov; Aleksey Fomovskiy; Dmitriy Bocharov; Edem Eminov	1	Olga Zabelinskaya; Yanina Kuskova; Margarita Misyurina; Nafosat Kozieva
4–8 April	Uzbekistan; Namangan	2	Vladislav Troman; Daniil Fedorov; Farrukh Bobosherov; Davirjan Abdurakhmanov	2	Evgeniya Golotina; Shakhnoza Abdullaeva; Ekaterina Knebeleva; Madina Kakhkhorova
4–8 April	Uzbekistan; Namangan	3	Sanjarbek Ergashev; Diyor Takhirov; Danil Otchenko; Samandar Janikulov	3	Sevinch Yuldasheva; Kseniya Li; Mohinabonu Elmurodova; Asal Rizaeva
5 April	South Africa; Cape Town	1	Carl Bonthuys; Wynand Hofmeyr; Danieyell Matthews; Joshua Louw	1	Tia Marnewick; Charlissa Schultz; Amber Hindmarch; Ashleigh Parsons
5 April	South Africa; Cape Town	2	Joshua Dike; Matthew Lester; Marco Abrahams; James Swart	2	Linél Engelbrecht; Chanel Fourie; Sunique van der Walt; Michaela Lubbe
5 April	South Africa; Cape Town	3		3	
28–30 April	Bolivia; La Paz	1		1	
28–30 April	Bolivia; La Paz	2		2	
28–30 April	Bolivia; La Paz	3		3	
11 May	Japan; Shizuoka	1	Kazushige Kuboki; Eiya Hashimoto; Shunsuke Imamura; Shoi Matsuda	1	Kie Furuyama; Maho Kakita; Mizuki Ikeda; Tsuyaka Uchino
11 May	Japan; Shizuoka	2	Tetsuo Yamamoto; Shoki Kawano; Katsuya Okamoto; Toranosuke Yamashita	2	
11 May	Japan; Shizuoka	3	Hiroaki Harada; Daichi Tomio; Takato Koyata; Ryo Tsudome	3	
15–19 May	Malaysia; Nilai	1	Muhammad Yusri Shaari; Ariff Danial Noor Roseidi; Mior Muhammad Hazwan Hamzah; Muhammad Haziq Abd Wahab	1	
15–19 May	Malaysia; Nilai	2	Yong Kiat Khow; Muhammad Amir Farhan Haizeman; Muhammad Luqman Daniel Mohammad Roji; Maximillian Fong Hung Chiat	2	
15–19 May	Malaysia; Nilai	3	Zi Hen Heng; Muhammad Hariz Md Hazri; Muhammad Faheem Razen Muhammad Zaini; Muhammad Adam Danish Afdzal	3	
20 May	Kazakhstan; Astana	1	Andrey Kreis; Maxim Khoroshavin; Dmitry Oleinikov; Ilya Karabutov	1	Faina Potapova; Svetlana Pashchenko; Bota Batyrbekova; Veronika Myrxina; Violetta Kazakova
20 May	Kazakhstan; Astana	2	Ruslan Yelyubayev; Zhalgas Abubakar; Daniil Bezyanov; Vadim Belugin	2	Marina Kurnossova; Yelena Mandrakova; Milana Kotelnikova; Amina Orazbaeva
20 May	Kazakhstan; Astana	3	Asylkhan Turar; Aslan Silykbek; Sayat Aidarkhan; Dias Turat	3	Ekaterina Apachidi; Kristina Gabaidulina; Karina Abdrakhmanova; Nina Shtro
3 June	Ukraine; Lviv	1	Maksym Vasyliev; Yaroslav Kozakov; Roman Gladysh; Vitaliy Hryniv; Vladyslav Shcherban	1	Kateryna Velichko; Anna Kolyzhuk; Iryna Semenova; Maryna Ivaniuk; Yuliia Skoryschenko
3 June	Ukraine; Lviv	2	Yurii Shcherban; Andriy Zozulya; Mykyta Yakovlev; Oleksandr Smetanyuk; Svyatoslav Gorbovii	2	Irina Shimanska; Bogdana Levchenko; Arina Korotieieva; Daryna Belyak; Violetta Kondrut
3 June	Ukraine; Lviv	3	Bohdan Boryslavskyi; Mykola Kravchuk; Ruslan Kornienko; Serhii Sydor; Dmytro Kachur	3	Tetyana Tkhir; Valeriya Iosenko; Elizaveta Dziman; Nadia Voytovych; Ulyana Levchenko
9–11 June	Spain; Valencia	1	Sergi Amengual; Llorenç Tomàs; Joan Bennassar; Francesc Bennassar; Xavier Cañellas	1	
9–11 June	Spain; Valencia	2	Jose Segura García; Alejandro Merenciano López; Mario Álvarez; Agustín Sebastiá Álvarez; Ricardo Díaz Chilet	2	
9–11 June	Spain; Valencia	3	Alberto Pérez Díaz; Pedro Izquierdo Conesa; Eloy Teruel; José María García Soriano; Francisco García Rus	3	
1–5 June 2023	China; Hangzhou (2023 Edition)	1	Sun Haijiao; Haiao Zhang; Wentao Sun; Yang Yang	1	
1–5 June 2023	China; Hangzhou (2023 Edition)	2	Chenrui Liu; Mengjie Wang; Boan Li; Jinyan Zhang	2	
1–5 June 2023	China; Hangzhou (2023 Edition)	3	Jiacheng Li; Pengcheng Zhao; Qiu Zhentao; Zhaoyi He	3	
14–18 June	Germany; Cottbus	1	Benjamin Boos; Theo Reinhardt; Tobias Buck-Gramcko; Nicolas Heinrich	1	Hanna Dopjans; Franziska Brauße; Lana Eberle; Lea Lin Teutenberg
14–18 June	Germany; Cottbus	2	Jonathan Malte Rottmann; Ben Felix Jochum; Lucas Liss; Jan-Marc Temmen	2	Dorothea Heitzmann; Lena Charlotte Reißner; Lara Röhricht; Seana Littbarski-Gray
14–18 June	Germany; Cottbus	3	Jasper Schröder; Tobias Müller; Franz Groß; Johannes Reißmann	3	Justyna Czapla; Selma Lantzsch; Marla Sigmund; Fabienne Jährig
27–29 June	Italy; Fiorenzuola d'Arda	1	Elia Viviani; Michele Scartezzini; Francesco Lamon; Davide Boscaro	1	Martina Alzini; Martina Fidanza; Francesca Pellegrini; Sara Fiorin
27–29 June	Italy; Fiorenzuola d'Arda	2	Lino Colosio; Mattia Pinazzi; Manlio Moro; Niccolò Galli	1	Valentina Scandolara; Emma Redaelli; Giorgia Serena; Beatrice Caudera
27–29 June	Italy; Fiorenzuola d'Arda	3	Alessio Delle Vedove; Samuel Quaranta; Bryan Olivo; Daniel Skerl	1	Elena Bissolati; Giada Capobianchi; Irene Oneda; Martina Puiatti
1–5 July	South Korea; Yangyang County	1	Hun Jang; Hong Seung-min; Park Sang-hoon; Kang Suk-ho	1	No Yun-seo; Kim Chae-yeon; Shin Ji-eun; Choi Min-jung
1–5 July	South Korea; Yangyang County	2	Shin Dong-in; Kim Sang-pyo; Bae Seung-bin; Ahn Hui-sang; Bae Jun-hyeong; Kim Jeong-min	1	Lee Eun-hee; Song Min-ji; Ha Jie-un; Na A-reum
1–5 July	South Korea; Yangyang County	3	Lee Jae-ha; Lee Hyoung-jun; Min Kyeong-ho; Jang Yeon-ho	1	Kim Min-hwa; Jang Su-ji; Kim Bo-mi; Kim Min-jeong
5–9 July	United States; Carson	1	David Domonoske; Anders Johnson; Brendan Rhim; Viggo Moore	1	Elizabeth Stevenson; Danielle Morshead; Jessica Chong; Reagen Pattishall
5–9 July	United States; Carson	2	Lance Abshire; Zach Gregg; Spencer Seggebruch; Colby Lange	1	Morgan James; Hayley Bates; Chloe Patrick; Monique Snieders
5–9 July	United States; Carson	3	Grant Koontz; Bradley Green; Anton Gibson; Patton Sims	1	Haley Nielsen; Gabrielle Zacks; Sue Lin Holt; Josie Bircher
20–23 July	Colombia; Medellín	1	Juan Arango; Johan Antonio Colón; Anderson Arboleda; Brayan Sánchez	1	Andrea Alzate; Elizabeth Castaño; Lina Hernández; Estefanía Herrera
20–23 July	Colombia; Medellín	2	Alex Zapata; Bryan Gómez; Jhojan Steven Marín; Jarlinson Pantano	1	Valery Nicole Londoño; Marynes Prada; Kimberly Escobar; Lina Mabel Rojas
20–23 July	Colombia; Medellín	3	Yeison Chaparro; Diego Ochoa; Néstor Javier Rueda; Erin Fabián Espinel	1	
28 July	Finland	1	Antti Träskelin; Timo Erjomaa; Jukka Lehikoinen; Juha Lipponen	1	
28 July	Finland	2		2	
28 July	Finland	3		3	
28–30 July	Greece; Athens	1	Dimitrios Katsimpouras; Martinos Moutsios; Theocharis Tsiantos; Christos Volikakis	1	Aikaterini Chatzistefani; Eirini Maria Karousou; Eleni Kokoliou; Ioanna Plega-Gavrilaki
28–30 July	Greece; Athens	2	Miltiadis Giannoutsos; Iosif Farantakis; Charalampos Kastrantas; Zisis Soulios	2	
28–30 July	Greece; Athens	3	Panagiotis Chionis; Dionysios Douzas; Markos Dimitrios Kordas; Ioannis Varotsos	3	
5 August	Ireland; Dublin	1	Jason Kenny; Rhys Kenny; Sean Landers; Conor Murnane	1	Jennifer Bates; Autumn Collins; Francine Meehan; Annalise Murphy
5 August	Ireland; Dublin	2	John Caffrey; Sean Curtis; Andrew Kavanagh; Keith Meghen	2	Catherine Mahoney; Jennifer Neenan; Clodagh Ní Ghallchóir; Orla Walsh
5 August	Ireland; Dublin	3	Daniel McElroy; Sean Murnane; Fionn Sheridan; Callum O'Toole	3	Deirbhle Ivory; Helen McParland; Ellen Ní Cléirigh; Nikki Taggart
15–17 September	Poland	1	Kamil Kudliński; Mateusz Cywiński; Jan Krukowski; Maciej Noceń	1	Maja Tracka; Olga Wankiewicz; Tamara Szalińska; Nikol Płosaj; Wiktoria Pikulik
15–17 September	Poland	2	Adam Woźniak; Konrad Waliniak; Aleksander Krukowski; Kacper Majewski	2	Dorota Przęzak; Patrycja Lorkowska; Agata Lichosyt; Julia Włodarczyk
15–17 September	Poland	3	Filip Aspadarec; Mateusz Stempnakowski; Karol Stelmach; Kacper Centka	3	Barbara Gorzkiewicz; Pola Błońska; Anna Samecka; Martyna Pietrasik
15–17 September	Thailand	1	Patompob Phonarjthan; Janluang Jetsada; Thanawut Sanikwathi; Phurit Rodvilai; Ekapak Nirapathpongporn	1	
15–17 September	Thailand	2	Sakchai Phodingam; Yuttana Mano; Thanachat Yatan; Peerapong Ladngern; Putipong Chaloemsrimueang	2	
15–17 September	Thailand	3	Khurkoon Chaiwong; Thanapon Wongla; Kantaphon Kunkumpai; Kanokphan Keongamaroon; Adulwit Phosangda	3	
23 September	Czech Republic	1		1	Veronika Bartoníková; Gabriela Bártová; Kateřina Kohoutková; Petra Ševčíková
23 September	Czech Republic	2		2	
23 September	Czech Republic	3		3	
23 September	Switzerland	1	Simon Vitzthum; Claudio Imhof; Nicolò De Lisi; Dominik Bieler	1	
23 September	Switzerland	2	Arthur Guillet; Valère Thiébaud; Alex Vogel; Matteo Constant	2	
23 September	Switzerland	3	Pascal Tappeiner; Damien Fortis; Justin Weder; Dominik Weiss	3	
27–29 September 2023 (2023 Edition)	Romania; Plovdiv (Bulgaria)	1	Carol-Eduard Novak; Adi Narcis Marcu; János Török; Edvard Novak	1	
27–29 September 2023 (2023 Edition)	Romania; Plovdiv (Bulgaria)	2	Valentin Pleșa; Csaba Bartha; Sebastian Mihai Paveliu	2	
27–29 September 2023 (2023 Edition)	Romania; Plovdiv (Bulgaria)	3	Erick Rogoz-Lorincz; Alin Toader; Mihai Băbăiță; Alexandru Hojda	3	
4–8 October	Argentina	1		1	
4–8 October	Argentina	2		2	
4–8 October	Argentina	3		3	
13–15 October	Bulgaria	1	Ventsislav Venkov; Alexander Popov; Martin Popov; Borislav Palashev	1	
13–15 October	Bulgaria	2	Yordan Petrov; Georgi Lumparov; Yoan Kolev; Hristo Gechev	2	
13–15 October	Bulgaria	3	Borislav Ivanov; Emil Ivanov; Ivan Georgiev; Ivailo Karamanolev	3	
20 October	Slovenia	1	Matic Žumer; Mihael Štajnar; Marko Pavlič; Luka Vrhovnik	1	
20 October	Slovenia	2	Grega Podlesnik; Luka Ziherl; Natan Gregorčič; Andraž Skok	2	
20 October	Slovenia	3	Aljaž Turk; Tilen Finkšt; Jaka Špoljar; Bine Miškulin	3	
29 November – 3 December	Venezuela	1	Máximo Rojas; Clever Martínez; Enmanuel Viloria; Max Scovino	1	
29 November – 3 December	Venezuela	2		2	
29 November – 3 December	Venezuela	3		3	
30 November – 4 December	India	1	Vishavjeet Singh; Venkappa Kengalagutti; Manjeet Kumar; Anil Manglaw; Naman Kapil	1	Swasti Singh; Chayanika Gogoi; Monika Jat; Vaishnavi Gabne; Sonali Chanu Mayanglambam
30 November – 4 December	India	2	Sahil Kumar; Dinesh Kumar; Manjeet Singh; Krishna Naykodi	2	Khoirom Rejiya Devi; N Biseshori Chanu; N. Anita; Yurembam Gitu Devi; Manorama Devi
30 November – 4 December	India	3	Deepanshu Jain; Sushant Singh; Neeraj Kumar; Gurnoor Poonia; Ratan Singh	3	Shushikala Agashe; Pooja Danole; Sanskruti Khese; Shiya Lalwani
8–10 December	Chile	1	Cristóbal Olavarría; Joaquín Corvalán; Esteban Olivos; Sebastián Reyes Jofré	1	]
8–10 December	Chile	2	Ruben Santander; Christopher Ponce Mejías; Daniel Bretti; Nicolás Vergara	2	
8–10 December	Chile	3		3	
8–10 December	Denmark	1	Anders Fynbo; Sebastian Juul; Oskar Ulrik Winkler; Ian Millennium; Arne Birkemose	1	Anika Rasmussen; Ida Fialla; Amalie Winther Olsen; Mikka Holm
8–10 December	Denmark	2	Jonathan Aagaard Hansen; Nikolaj Ankerstjerne Klausen; August Birk Hundt; Julius Johansen	2	Tusnelda Svanholmer; Anna Margrethe Hansen; Ida Krickau Ketelsen; Mathilde Cramer
8–10 December	Denmark	3	Conrad Haugsted; Peter Bheki Kring Laursen; Anton Louw Larsen; Gustav Johansen	3	
9–11 December	Czech Republic	1	Jan Voneš; Radovan Štec; Petr Vávra; Matyáš Koblížek	1	
9–11 December	Czech Republic	2	Tomáš Bárta; Daniel Babor; Pavel Novák; Denis Rugovac	2	
9–11 December	Czech Republic	3	Viktor Padělek; Šimon Vaníček; Michal Rotter; Adam Křenek	3	

== UCI Track Rankings ==
Rankings as of 2 January 2024.

=== Men ===
Sprint

	Individual Ranking	Points
1	(Poland) Mateusz Rudyk	3160
2	(Netherlands) Harrie Lavreysen	2980
3	(Trinidad and Tobago) Nicholas Paul	2900
4	(Japan) Kaiya Ota	2710
5	(Israel) Mikhail Iakovlev	2665

	Team Ranking	Points
1	(Japan) Team Rakuten K Dreams	4338
2	(United Kingdom) Team Inspired	3426
3	(Canada) National Cycling Institute Milton	2525
4	(France) Creteil Kronos	2450
5	(Malaysia) Team Azizul	2157

	Nation Ranking	Points
1	Australia (AUS)	5915
2	Japan (JPN)	5105
3	Great Britain (GBR)	4972
4	Netherlands (NED)	4549
5	Trinidad and Tobago (TTO)	4464

Keirin

	Individual Ranking	Points
1	(Australia) Matthew Richardson	2920
2	(Netherlands) Harrie Lavreysen	2740
3	(Japan) Shinji Nakano	2685
4	(Malaysia) Azizulhasni Awang	2500
5	(Israel) Mikhail Iakovlev	2458

	Team Ranking	Points
1	(Japan) Team Rakuten K Dreams	5020
2	(Kazakhstan) Astana Track Team	2808
3	(Malaysia) Team Azizul	2713
4	(Canada) National Cycling Institute Milton	2561
5	(United Kingdom) Team Inspired	2481

	Nation Ranking	Points
1	Australia (AUS)	6510
2	Japan (JPN)	5996
3	Great Britain (GBR)	4750
4	Malaysia (MAS)	4695
5	Netherlands (NED)	4351

1 km Time Trial

	Individual Ranking	Points
1	(Netherlands) Jeffrey Hoogland	1600
2	(Australia) Matthew Glaetzer	1500
3	(Australia) Thomas Cornish	1430
4	(Italy) Matteo Bianchi	1395
5	(Germany) Maximilian Dörnbach	1280

	Team Ranking	Points
1	(Canada) National Cycling Institute Milton	1380
2	(United Kingdom) Team Inspired	1200
3	(Kazakhstan) Astana Track Team	641
4	(Spain) Eustrak–Euskadi	562
5	(Iran) Water Waves Land Mashhad	540

	Nation Ranking	Points
1	Australia (AUS)	3320
2	Netherlands (NED)	2400
3	Germany (GER)	2290
4	Spain (ESP)	2286
5	Italy (ITA)	1963

Omnium

	Individual Ranking	Points
1	(Portugal) Iúri Leitão	2060
2	(Spain) Sebastián Mora	1710
3	(Japan) Shunsuke Imamura	1705
4	(France) Benjamin Thomas	1680
5	(Italy) Elia Viviani	1640

	Team Ranking	Points
1	(Japan) Team Bridgestone Cycling	3811
2	(United States) Chaney Windows and Doors	2194
3	(United Kingdom) Team Inspired	2003
4	(Netherlands) Beat Cycling Club	1870
5	(Hong Kong) HKSI Pro Cycling Team	1614

	Nation Ranking	Points
1	France (FRA)	4516
2	Japan (JPN)	4150
3	Italy (ITA)	3929
4	Great Britain (GBR)	3560
5	New Zealand (NZL)	3549

Points Race

	Individual Ranking	Points
1	(United Kingdom) William Perrett	1665
2	(Spain) Albert Torres	1640
3	(Hungary) Bertold Drijver	1596
4	(Canada) Mathias Guillemette	1360
5	(Japan) Naoki Kojima	1300

	Team Ranking	Points
1	(United States) Chaney Windows and Doors	2304
2	(Japan) Team Bridgestone Cycling	1590
3	(Netherlands) Beat Cycling Club	1253
4	(United Kingdom) Team Inspired	938
5	(Hong Kong) HKSI Pro Cycling Team	785

	Nation Ranking	Points
1	Italy (ITA)	3325
2	Great Britain (GBR)	2988
3	France (FRA)	2941
4	United States (USA)	2760
5	Belgium (BEL)	2700

Scratch Race

	Individual Ranking	Points
1	(Netherlands) Roy Eefting	1953
2	(Belgium) Tuur Dens	1815
3	(Canada) Dylan Bibic	1746
4	(Denmark) Tobias Hansen	1744
5	(France) Donavan Grondin	1380

	Team Ranking	Points
1	(United Kingdom) Team Inspired	2602
2	(Kazakhstan) Astana Track Team	1626
3	(Japan) Team Bridgestone Cycling	1540
4	(France) Giant Dijon Track Team	1212
5	(United States) Chaney Windows and Doors	1174

	Nation Ranking	Points
1	Great Britain (GBR)	3512
2	France (FRA)	3265
3	Netherlands (NED)	3158
4	Denmark (DEN)	2808
5	United States (USA)	2796

4 km Pursuit

	Individual Ranking	Points
1	(United Kingdom) Daniel Bigham	1440
2	(Germany) Tobias Buck-Gramcko	1405
3	(Italy) Jonathan Milan	1400
4	(Canada) Chris Ernst	1150
5	(Belgium) Noah Vandenbranden	1030

	Team Ranking	Points
1	(Japan) Team Bridgestone Cycling	1647
2	(Hong Kong) HKSI Pro Cycling Team	1080
3	(Kazakhstan) Astana Track Team	761
4	(United Kingdom) Team Inspired	700
5	(South Korea) Uijeongbu Cycling Team	420

	Nation Ranking	Points
1	Italy (ITA)	3742
2	Germany (GER)	2720
3	Great Britain (GBR)	2420
4	Australia (AUS)	2370
5	Canada (CAN)	2067

Madison

	Individual Ranking	Points
1	(Netherlands) Yoeri Havik	2810
2	(Germany) Roger Kluge (Germany) Theo Reinhardt	2620
4	(Netherlands) Jan Willem van Schip	2390
5	(Italy) Michele Scartezzini	2290

	Team Ranking	Points
1	(Japan) Team Bridgestone Cycling	6662
2	(Netherlands) Beat Cycling Club	5094
3	(Kazakhstan) Astana Track Team	2920
4	(United Kingdom) Team Inspired	2836
5	(United States) Chaney Windows and Doors	2699

	Nation Ranking	Points
1	Germany (GER)	8419
2	Netherlands (NED)	8380
3	Italy (ITA)	8070
4	France (FRA)	7431
5	New Zealand (NZL)	7395

Elimination

	Individual Ranking	Points
1	(Belgium) Jules Hesters	2364
2	(Canada) Dylan Bibic	2326
3	(Japan) Eiya Hashimoto	2005
4	(Denmark) Tobias Hansen	1887
5	(Netherlands) Matthijs Büchli	1765

	Team Ranking	Points
1	(France) Giant Dijon Track Team	1867
2	(Japan) Team Bridgestone Cycling	1750
3	(Netherlands) Beat Cycling Club	1720
4	(Kazakhstan) Astana Track Team	1575
5	(United States) Chaney Windows and Doors	1268

	Nation Ranking	Points
1	Italy (ITA)	4230
2	Great Britain (GBR)	3662
3	New Zealand (NZL)	3429
4	Germany (GER)	3288
5	Czech Republic (CZE)	3145

Team Sprint

	Team Ranking	Points
1	(Canada) National Cycling Institute Milton	1950
2	(United Kingdom) Team Inspired	1815
3	(Japan) Team Rakuten K Dreams	1462.5
4	(France) Creteil Kronos	1085
5	(Japan) Team Bridgestone Cycling	675

	Nation Ranking	Points
1	Netherlands (NED)	4050
2	Australia (AUS)	3900
3	France (FRA)	3660
4	China (CHN)	3330
5	Germany (GER)	3165

Team Pursuit

	Team Ranking	Points
1	(Japan) Team Bridgestone Cycling	2660
2	(Uzbekistan) Tashkent Track Team	1242.5
3	(Kazakhstan) Astana Track Team	1235
4	(United States) Chaney Windows and Doors	1015
5	(United Kingdom) Team Inspired	991

	Nation Ranking	Points
1	Italy (ITA)	5000
2	Denmark (DEN)	4660
3	New Zealand (NZL)	4320
4	Australia (AUS)	4250
5	France (FRA)	4240

=== Women ===
Sprint

	Individual Ranking	Points
1	(United Kingdom) Emma Finucane	3150
2	(Germany) Lea Friedrich	2890
3	(United Kingdom) Sophie Capewell	2592
4	(New Zealand) Ellesse Andrews	2575
5	(France) Mathilde Gros	2310

	Team Ranking	Points
1	(United Kingdom) Team Inspired	5339
2	(Japan) Team Rakuten K Dreams	2181
3	(Canada) National Cycling Institute Milton	2175
4	(France) Creteil Kronos	1864
5	(Japan) Team Bridgestone Cycling	1597

	Nation Ranking	Points
1	Great Britain (GBR)	6560
2	Germany (GER)	6083
3	France (FRA)	4948
4	Canada (CAN)	4832
5	Japan (JPN)	4516

Keirin

	Individual Ranking	Points
1	(New Zealand) Ellesse Andrews	2890
2	(Belgium) Nicky Degrendele	2793
3	(Colombia) Martha Bayona	2775
4	(Japan) Mina Sato	2330
5	(France) Mathilde Gros	2140

	Team Ranking	Points
1	(United Kingdom) Team Inspired	3671
2	(Japan) Team Rakuten K Dreams	3291
3	(Canada) National Cycling Institute Milton	1910
4	(Hong Kong) HKSI Pro Cycling Team	1747
5	(France) Creteil Kronos	1529

	Nation Ranking	Points
1	Germany (GER)	5220
2	Japan (JPN)	5018
3	Australia (AUS)	4695
4	Great Britain (GBR)	4654
5	Canada (CAN)	4515

500m Time Trial

	Individual Ranking	Points
1	(Germany) Emma Hinze	1700
2	(Australia) Kristina Clonan	1500
3	(Germany) Pauline Grabosch	1200
4	(Colombia) Martha Bayona	1200
5	(China) Jiang Yulu	1150

	Team Ranking	Points
1	(United Kingdom) Team Inspired	2625
2	(France) Creteil Kronos	1561
3	(Canada) National Cycling Institute Milton	730
4	(Kazakhstan) Astana Track Team	370
5	(United States) Star Track Cycling	230

	Nation Ranking	Points
1	Germany (GER)	3210
2	Great Britain (GBR)	2625
3	Australia (AUS)	2590
4	United States (USA)	1890
5	China (CHN)	1850

Omnium

	Individual Ranking	Points
1	(United Kingdom) Katie Archibald	2150
2	(Denmark) Amalie Dideriksen	2130
3	(United States) Jennifer Valente	2090
4	(Norway) Anita Stenberg	2060
5	(Japan) Yumi Kajihara	2058

	Team Ranking	Points
1	(Hong Kong) HKSI Pro Cycling Team	1862
2	(United Kingdom) Team Inspired	1852
3	(Uzbekistan) Tashkent Track Team	1819
4	(Japan) Team Rakuten K Dreams	1709
5	(United States) Star Track Cycling	770

	Nation Ranking	Points
1	Great Britain (GBR)	4260
2	France (FRA)	4090
3	United States (USA)	3932
4	Poland (POL)	3795
5	Italy (ITA)	3517

Points Race

	Individual Ranking	Points
1	(Netherlands) Marit Raaijmakers	1500
2	(United Kingdom) Neah Evans	1400
3	(Belgium) Lotte Kopecky	1300
4	(Germany) Lea Lin Teutenberg	1210
5	(Norway) Anita Stenberg	1180

	Team Ranking	Points
1	(United Kingdom) Team Inspired	2902
2	(Uzbekistan) Tashkent Track Team	2059
3	(Japan) Team Rakuten K Dreams	1370
4	(Spain) Eustrak–Euskadi	499
5	(France) Alltricks.com – Sprinteur Club Féminin	341

	Nation Ranking	Points
1	Great Britain (GBR)	3052
2	Belgium (BEL)	3011
3	France (FRA)	2892
4	United States (USA)	2854
5	Czech Republic (CZE)	2660

Scratch Race

	Individual Ranking	Points
1	(Italy) Martina Fidanza	1520
2	(Norway) Anita Stenberg	1470
3	(Lithuania) Olivija Baleišytė	1411
4	(Netherlands) Maike van der Duin	1390
5	(United States) Jennifer Valente	1364

	Team Ranking	Points
1	(United Kingdom) Team Inspired	2473
2	(Hong Kong) HKSI Pro Cycling Team	939
3	(Japan) Team Rakuten K Dreams	740
4	(Uzbekistan) Tashkent Track Team	596
5	(United States) Star Track Cycling	550

	Nation Ranking	Points
1	United States (USA)	3401
2	Poland (POL)	3145
3	Great Britain (GBR)	2830
4	France (FRA)	2744
5	Ireland (IRL)	2681

3 km Pursuit

	Individual Ranking	Points
1	(Germany) Franziska Brauße	1600
2	(New Zealand) Bryony Botha	1400
3	(Canada) Ariane Bonhomme	1080
4	(Poland) Olga Wankiewicz	1061
5	(New Zealand) Sami Donnelly	1050

	Team Ranking	Points
1	(United Kingdom) Team Inspired	2040
2	(Japan) Team Rakuten K Dreams	697
3	(United States) Star Track Cycling	600
4	(United States) Chaney Windows and Doors	530
5	(Uzbekistan) Tashkent Track Team	450

	Nation Ranking	Points
1	Germany (GER)	2960
2	New Zealand (NZL)	2640
3	Great Britain (GBR)	2490
4	Canada (CAN)	2220
5	Poland (POL)	1904

Madison

	Individual Ranking	Points
1	(Poland) Wiktoria Pikulik	2330
2	(Italy) Clara Copponi	2140
3	(New Zealand) Bryony Botha	2140
4	(France) Victoire Berteau	2040
5	(Poland) Daria Pikulik	2000

	Team Ranking	Points
1	(United Kingdom) Team Inspired	4840
2	(Uzbekistan) Tashkent Track Team	3891
3	(Japan) Team Rakuten K Dreams	3380
4	(Hong Kong) HKSI Pro Cycling Team	1831
5	(France) Alltricks.com – Sprinteur Club Féminin	370

	Nation Ranking	Points
1	Great Britain (GBR)	7770
2	France (FRA)	7550
3	Poland (POL)	7400
4	Italy (ITA)	6254
5	Ireland (IRL)	5804

Elimination

	Individual Ranking	Points
1	(Norway) Anita Stenberg	2035
2	(United States) Jennifer Valente	1976
3	(Germany) Lea Lin Teutenberg	1825
4	(Belgium) Lotte Kopecky	1800
5	(Poland) Patrycja Lorkowska	1800

	Team Ranking	Points
1	(United Kingdom) Team Inspired	2310
2	(Japan) Team Rakuten K Dreams	1430
3	(Uzbekistan) Tashkent Track Team	1194
4	(France) Alltricks.com – Sprinteur Club Féminin	196
5	(Spain) Eustrak–Euskadi	105

	Nation Ranking	Points
1	United States (USA)	3904
2	France (FRA)	3605
3	Belgium (BEL)	3542
4	Italy (ITA)	3325
5	Great Britain (GBR)	3321

Team Sprint

	Team Ranking	Points
1	(United Kingdom) Team Inspired	2910
2	(Canada) National Cycling Institute Milton	1815
3	(France) Creteil Kronos	1040
4	(Japan) Team Rakuten K Dreams	720
5	(Hong Kong) HKSI Pro Cycling Team	430

	Nation Ranking	Points
1	Great Britain (GBR)	3870
2	Germany (GER)	3750
3	China (CHN)	3600
4	Mexico (MEX)	3225
5	Canada (CAN)	3185

Team Pursuit

	Team Ranking	Points
1	(United Kingdom) Team Inspired	2200
2	(Japan) Team Rakuten K Dreams	1865
3	(Uzbekistan) Tashkent Track Team	1240
4	(United States) Star Track Cycling	275
5	(Hong Kong) HKSI Pro Cycling Team	250

	Nation Ranking	Points
1	Great Britain (GBR)	5400
2	New Zealand (NZL)	4580
3	France (FRA)	4490
4	Italy (ITA)	4220
5	Germany (GER)	4080
