= 2021–22 UCI Track Cycling season =

International cycling contest

Details
- Dates: 28 October 2021 –
- Location: World

The 2021–22 UCI Track Cycling season is the seventeenth season of the UCI Track Cycling Season. The 2021–22 season began on 28 October 2021 with the Indonesian Track National Championships and will end in October 2022 with 2022 UCI Track Cycling World Championships. It is organised by the Union Cycliste Internationale.

== Events ==
=== 2021 ===
Event	Race	Winner	Second	Third
1st International TLV Track Meeting; Israel 30 October 2021	Points Race	Yanne Dorenbos (NED); Argiro Milaki (GRE)	Radovan Štec (CZE); Valentina Scandolara (ITA)	Noël Luijten (NED); Małgorzata Jasińska (POL)
1st International TLV Track Meeting; Israel 30 October 2021	Scratch	Vladislav Logionov (ISR); Valentina Scandolara (ITA)	Yanne Dorenbos (NED); Argiro Milaki (GRE)	Noël Luijten (NED); Maaike Brandwagt (NED)
UCI Track Champions League - Round 1 Spain 6 November 2021	Elimination Race	Corbin Strong (NZL); Katie Archibald (GBR)	Gavin Hoover (USA); Kirsten Wild (NED)	Sebastián Mora (ESP); Anita Stenberg (NOR)
UCI Track Champions League - Round 1 Spain 6 November 2021	Scratch	Corbin Strong (NZL); Maggie Coles-Lyster (CAN)	Rhys Britton (GBR); Olivija Baleišytė (LTU)	Iúri Leitão (POR); Hanna Tserakh (BLR)
UCI Track Champions League - Round 1 Spain 6 November 2021	Keirin	Stefan Bötticher (GER); Kelsey Mitchell (CAN)	Harrie Lavreysen (NED); Emma Hinze (GER)	Jeffrey Hoogland (NED); Martha Bayona (COL)
UCI Track Champions League - Round 1 Spain 6 November 2021	Sprint	Harrie Lavreysen (NED); Emma Hinze (GER)	Mikhail Iakovlev (RUS); Lea Friedrich (GER)	Jeffrey Hoogland (NED); Kelsey Mitchell (CAN)
DBC's 3 Days; Denmark 11–13 November 2021	Madison	Lasse Norman Hansen (DEN); Michael Mørkøv (DEN); Neah Evans (GBR); Katie Archibald (GBR)	Julius Johansen (DEN); Tobias Hansen (DEN); Amalie Dideriksen (DEN); Josie Knight (GBR)	Aaron Gate (NZL); Matias Malmberg (DEN); Nora Tveit (NOR); Finja Smekal (GER)
DBC's 3 Days; Denmark 11–13 November 2021	Omnium	Katie Archibald (GBR)	Neah Evans (GBR)	Josie Knight (GBR)
DBC's 3 Days; Denmark 11–13 November 2021	Points Race	Katie Archibald (GBR)	Neah Evans (GBR)	Amalie Dideriksen (DEN)
DBC's 3 Days; Denmark 11–13 November 2021	Scratch	Katie Archibald (GBR)	Amalie Dideriksen (DEN)	Neah Evans (GBR)
DBC's 3 Days; Denmark 11–13 November 2021	Elimination Race	Katie Archibald (GBR)	Neah Evans (GBR)	Amalie Dideriksen (DEN)
Track Asia Cup 2021; Thailand 17–21 November 2021
Track Asia Cup 2021; Thailand 17–21 November 2021	Sprint	Worayut Kapunya (THA); Pannaray Rasee (THA)	Nitirut Kitphiriyakan (THA); Syarifah Nuraisyah Umairah Syed Yusoff (MAS)	Jaturong Niwanti (THA); Kanyarat Hnokaew (THA)
Track Asia Cup 2021; Thailand 17–21 November 2021	Keirin	Pongthep Tapimay (THA); Pannaray Rasee (THA)	Worayut Kapunya (THA); Yaowaret Jitmat (THA)	Nitirut Kitphiriyakan (THA); Kanyarat Hnokaew (THA)
Track Asia Cup 2021; Thailand 17–21 November 2021	Time Trial	Wachirawit Saenkhamwong (THA); Yaowaret Jitmat (THA)	Ponsak Thamsuwan (THA); Kanyarat Hnokaew (THA)	Apirak Sonphet (THA); Syarifah Nuraisyah Umairah Syed Yusoff (MAS)
Track Asia Cup 2021; Thailand 17–21 November 2021	Individual Pursuit	Thanakhan Chaiyasombat (THA); Chaniporn Batriya (THA)	Thak Kaeonoi (THA); Phetdarin Somrat (THA)	Patsakorn Arunsri (THA); Kanyarat Kesthonglang (THA)
Track Asia Cup 2021; Thailand 17–21 November 2021	Points Race	Patompob Phonarjthan (THA); Jutatip Maneephan (THA)	Warut Paekrathok (THA); Supaksorn Nuntana (THA)	Chaiwat Lakdi (THA); Phetdarin Somrat (THA)
Track Asia Cup 2021; Thailand 17–21 November 2021	Omnium	Patompob Phonarjthan (THA); Supaksorn Nuntana (THA)	Thanakhan Chaiyasombat (THA); Jutatip Maneephan (THA)	Setthawut Yordsuwan (THA); Yonthanan Phonkla (THA)
Track Asia Cup 2021; Thailand 17–21 November 2021	Scratch	Setthawut Yordsuwan (THA); Jutatip Maneephan (THA)	Tullatorn Sosalam (THA); Supaksorn Nuntana (THA)	Loh Sea Keong (MAS); Phetdarin Somrat (THA)
Track Asia Cup 2021; Thailand 17–21 November 2021	Team Sprint	Men's Elite; Worayut Kapunya (THA); Pongthep Tapimay (THA); Jaturong Niwanti (THA); Women's Elite; Pannaray Rasee (THA); Yaowaret Jitmat (THA); Chaniporn Batriya (THA)	Men's Elite; Chetsadakon Chanthawet (THA); Panyapol Sornkla (THA); Apirak Sonphet (THA); Women's Elite; Yonthanan Phonkla (THA); Watinee Luekajorn (THA); Anna Dechaphan (THA)	Men's Elite; Sornwisit Saikrasunta (THA); Aukkrit Nomai (THA); Nitirut Kitphiriyakan (THA)
Six Days of Ghent; Belgium 16–21 November 2021
Six Days of Ghent; Belgium 16–21 November 2021	Men's Madison	Kenny De Ketele (BEL); Robbe Ghys (BEL)	Roger Kluge (GER); Jasper De Buyst (BEL)	Michael Mørkøv (DEN); Lasse Norman Hansen (DEN)
Six Days of Ghent; Belgium 16–21 November 2021	Women's Omnium	Lotte Kopecky (BEL)	Shari Bossuyt (BEL)	Amy Pieters (NED)
Six Days of Ghent; Belgium 16–21 November 2021	Women's Points Race	Lotte Kopecky (BEL)	Shari Bossuyt (BEL)	Marit Raaijmakers (NED)
The 61th Anniversary of Thai Cycling Association; Thailand 21 November 2021
The 61th Anniversary of Thai Cycling Association; Thailand 21 November 2021	Keirin	Pongthep Tapimay (THA); Nurul Izzati Mohd Asri (MAS)	Apirak Sonphet (THA); Pannaray Rasee (THA)	Muncheth Faimuenvai (THA); Yaowaret Jitmat (THA)
The 61th Anniversary of Thai Cycling Association; Thailand 21 November 2021	Points Race	Thanakhan Chaiyasombat (THA); Supaksorn Nuntana (THA)	Setthawut Yordsuwan (THA); Jutatip Maneephan (THA)	Tullatorn Sosalam (THA); Phetdarin Somrat (THA)
The 61th Anniversary of Thai Cycling Association; Thailand 21 November 2021	Scratch	Warut Paekrathok (THA); Jutatip Maneephan (THA)	Setthawut Yordsuwan (THA); Supaksorn Nuntana (THA)	Thanakhan Chaiyasombat (THA); Phetdarin Somrat (THA)
The 61th Anniversary of Thai Cycling Association; Thailand 21 November 2021	Sprint	Jaturong Niwanti (THA); Nurul Izzati Mohd Asri (MAS)	Pongthep Tapimay (THA); Pannaray Rasee (THA)	Danai Charoenchang (THA); Yaowaret Jitmat (THA)
The 61th Anniversary of Thai Cycling Association; Thailand 21 November 2021	Team Sprint	Men's Elite; Jaturong Niwanti (THA); Worayut Kapunya (THA); Wachirawit Saenkhamwong (THA); Women's Elite; Yaowaret Jitmat (THA); Pannaray Rasee (THA); Chaniporn Batriya (THA)	Men's Elite; Jirathip Avirutcheevin (THA); Ponsak Thamsuwan (THA); Muncheth Faimuenvai (THA); Women's Elite; Watinee Luekajorn (THA); Natthaporn Aphimot (THA); Thipphawan Naphom (THA)	Men's Elite; Chetsadakon Chanthawet (THA); Panyapol Sornkla (THA); Watcharaphong Naksuk (THA); Women's Elite; Syarifah Nuraisyah Umairah Syed Yusoff (MAS); Phi Kun Pan (MAS); Nurul Izzati Mohd Asri (MAS)
UCI Track Champions League - Round 2 Lithuania 27 November 2021
UCI Track Champions League - Round 2 Lithuania 27 November 2021	Elimination Race	Sebastián Mora (ESP); Katie Archibald (GBR)	Aaron Gate (NZL); Anita Stenberg (NOR)	Kelland O'Brien (AUS); Silvia Zanardi (ITA)
UCI Track Champions League - Round 2 Lithuania 27 November 2021	Keirin	Harrie Lavreysen (NED); Lea Friedrich (GER)	Jeffrey Hoogland (NED); Emma Hinze (GER)	Stefan Bötticher (GER); Kelsey Mitchell (CAN)
UCI Track Champions League - Round 2 Lithuania 27 November 2021	Scratch	Sebastián Mora (ESP); Katie Archibald (GBR)	Rhys Britton (GBR); Maggie Coles-Lyster (CAN)	Gavin Hoover (USA); Yumi Kajihara (JPN)
UCI Track Champions League - Round 2 Lithuania 27 November 2021	Sprint	Harrie Lavreysen (NED); Emma Hinze (GER)	Nicholas Paul (TTO); Lauriane Genest (CAN)	Kevin Quintero (COL); Olena Starikova (UKR)
4 jours de Genève; Switzerland 25–28 November 2021
4 jours de Genève; Switzerland 25–28 November 2021	Madison	Colby Lange (USA); William Perrett (GBR); Ella Barnwell (GBR); Madelaine Leech (GBR)	Joseph Berlin-Sémon (FRA); Loïc Perizzolo (SUI); Lily Williams (USA); Marit Raaijmakers (NED)	Ryan Schilt (NED); Simon Vitzthum (SUI); Bénédicte Ollier (FRA); Kristina Nenadović (FRA)
4 jours de Genève; Switzerland 25–28 November 2021	Women's Omnium	Lily Williams (USA)	Marit Raaijmakers (NED)	Ella Barnwell (GBR)
4 jours de Genève; Switzerland 25–28 November 2021	Points Race	Simon Vitzthum (SUI); Valentina Scandolara (ITA)	Colby Lange (USA); Madelaine Leech (GBR)	William Perrett (GBR); Lily Williams (USA)
4 jours de Genève; Switzerland 25–28 November 2021	Scratch	Yoeri Havik (NED); Sophie Lewis (GBR)	Simon Vitzthum (SUI); Lily Williams (USA)	Ryan Schilt (NED); Aline Seitz (SUI)
Troféu Internacional de Pista - José Bento Pessoa; Portugal 27 November 2021
Troféu Internacional de Pista - José Bento Pessoa; Portugal 27 November 2021	Men's Keirin	Ronaldo Laitonjam (IND)	Conor Rowley (IRL)	David Elkathchoongo (IND)
Troféu Internacional de Pista - José Bento Pessoa; Portugal 27 November 2021	Omnium	César Martingil (POR); Daniela Campos (POR)	Ivo Oliveira (POR); María Isabella Escalera (ESP)	Josh Charlton (GBR); Beatriz Roxo (POR)
Troféu Internacional de Pista - José Bento Pessoa; Portugal 27 November 2021	Men's Sprint	David Elkathchoongo (IND)	Esow Alben (IND)	Yanglem Rojit Singh (IND)
Troféu Internacional de Pista - José Bento Pessoa; Portugal 27 November 2021	Men's Madison	Joshua Giddings (GBR); Josh Charlton (GBR)	César Martingil (POR); Ivo Oliveira (POR)	Rodrigo Caixas (POR); Diogo Narciso (POR)
UCI Track Champions League - Round 3 United Kingdom 3 December 2021
UCI Track Champions League - Round 3 United Kingdom 3 December 2021	Elimination Race	Gavin Hoover (USA); Katie Archibald (GBR)	Alan Banaszek (POL); Kirsten Wild (NED)	Sebastián Mora (ESP); Annette Edmondson (AUS)
UCI Track Champions League - Round 3 United Kingdom 3 December 2021	Keirin	Stefan Bötticher (GER); Lea Friedrich (GER)	Vasilijus Lendel (LTU); Martha Bayona (COL)	Jair Tjon En Fa (SUR); Simona Krupeckaitė (LTU)
UCI Track Champions League - Round 3 United Kingdom 3 December 2021	Scratch	Claudio Imhof (SUI); Kirsten Wild (NED)	Kazushige Kuboki (JPN); Maria Martins (POR)	Sebastián Mora (ESP); Katie Archibald (GBR)
UCI Track Champions League - Round 3 United Kingdom 3 December 2021	Sprint	Harrie Lavreysen (NED); Emma Hinze (GER)	Stefan Bötticher (GER); Lea Friedrich (GER)	Vasilijus Lendel (LTU); Kelsey Mitchell (CAN)
UCI Track Champions League - Round 4 United Kingdom 4 December 2021
UCI Track Champions League - Round 4 United Kingdom 4 December 2021	Elimination Race	Iúri Leitão (POR); Katie Archibald (GBR)	Aaron Gate (NZL); Kirsten Wild (NED)	Roy Eefting (NED); Maria Martins (POR)
UCI Track Champions League - Round 4 United Kingdom 4 December 2021	Keirin	Stefan Bötticher (GER); Olena Starikova (UKR)	Harrie Lavreysen (NED); Kelsey Mitchell (CAN)	Kevin Quintero (COL); Martha Bayona (COL)
UCI Track Champions League - Round 4 United Kingdom 4 December 2021	Scratch	Roy Eefting (NED); Yumi Kajihara (JPN)	Corbin Strong (NZL); Katie Archibald (GBR)	William Tidball (GBR); Maggie Coles-Lyster (CAN)
UCI Track Champions League - Round 4 United Kingdom 4 December 2021	Sprint	Harrie Lavreysen (NED); Emma Hinze (GER)	Stefan Bötticher (GER); Kelsey Mitchell (CAN)	Mikhail Iakovlev (RUS); Lea Friedrich (GER)
Troféu Internacional de Pista - Alves Barbosa; Portugal 11 December 2021
Troféu Internacional de Pista - Alves Barbosa; Portugal 11 December 2021	Omnium	Ivo Oliveira (POR); Anita Stenberg (NOR)	Iúri Leitão (POR); Lydia Boylan (IRL)	Rui Oliveira (POR); Lily Williams (USA)
Troféu Internacional de Pista - Alves Barbosa; Portugal 11 December 2021	Men's Keirin	Vasilijus Lendel (LTU)	Ronaldo Singh (IND)	Esow Alben (IND)
Troféu Internacional de Pista - Alves Barbosa; Portugal 11 December 2021	Madison	Ivo Oliveira (POR); Rui Oliveira (POR); Aline Seitz (SUI); Léna Mettraux (SUI)	João Matias (POR); Iúri Leitão (POR); Michelle Andres (SUI); Lily Williams (USA)	Jack Brough (GBR); Jack Rootkin-Gray (GBR); Flavie Boulais (FRA); Bénédicte Ollier (FRA)
Troféu Internacional de Pista - SUNLIVE; Portugal 12 December 2021
Troféu Internacional de Pista - SUNLIVE; Portugal 12 December 2021	Men's Sprint	Vasilijus Lendel (LTU)	Svajūnas Jonauskas (LTU)	Ryan Dodyk (CAN)
Troféu Internacional de Pista - SUNLIVE; Portugal 12 December 2021	Scratch	Gavin Hoover (USA); Eukene Larrarte (ESP)	Ivo Oliveira (POR); Bénédicte Ollier (FRA)	William Tidball (GBR); Lily Williams (USA)
Troféu Internacional de Pista - SUNLIVE; Portugal 12 December 2021	Omnium	Ivo Oliveira (POR); Anita Stenberg (NOR)	Rui Oliveira (POR); Lily Williams (USA)	William Tidball (GBR); Lydia Boylan (IRL)
Troféu Internacional de Pista - SUNLIVE; Portugal 12 December 2021	Men's Keirin	Vasilijus Lendel (LTU)	Svajūnas Jonauskas (LTU)	Esow Alben (IND)
Track Cycling Challenge; Switzerland 17–18 December 2021
Track Cycling Challenge; Switzerland 17–18 December 2021	Men's Individual Pursuit	Kyle Gordon (GBR)	Michael Gill (GBR)	Simon Vitzthum (SUI)
Track Cycling Challenge; Switzerland 17–18 December 2021	Keirin	Sébastien Vigier (FRA); Taky Marie-Divine Kouamé (FRA)	Alexander Dubchenko (RUS); Steffie van der Peet (NED)	Patryk Rajkowski (POL); Paulina Petri (POL)
Track Cycling Challenge; Switzerland 17–18 December 2021	Madison	Tristan Marguet (SUI); Robin Froidevaux (SUI); Neah Evans (GBR); Madelaine Leech (GBR)	Ethan Vernon (GBR); Oliver Wood (GBR); Megan Barker (GBR); Sophie Lewis (GBR)	Simon Vitzthum (SUI); Valère Thiébaud (SUI); Aline Seitz (SUI); Lily Williams (USA)
Track Cycling Challenge; Switzerland 17–18 December 2021	Omnium	Ethan Vernon (GBR); Neah Evans (GBR)	Oliver Wood (GBR); Emily Kay (IRL)	Rasmus Pedersen (DEN); Lily Williams (USA)
Track Cycling Challenge; Switzerland 17–18 December 2021	Sprint	Daniel Rochna (POL); Miriam Vece (ITA)	Sébastien Vigier (FRA); Taky Marie-Divine Kouamé (FRA)	Sam Ligtlee (NED); Lauren Bell (GBR)
Track Cycling Challenge; Switzerland 17–18 December 2021	Points Race	Oliver Wood (GBR); Neah Evans (GBR)	Szymon Sajnok (POL); Léna Mettraux (SUI)	Simon Vitzthum (SUI); Emily Kay (IRL)
Track Cycling Challenge; Switzerland 17–18 December 2021	Scratch	Ethan Vernon (GBR); Neah Evans (GBR)	Oliver Wood (GBR); Emily Kay (IRL)	Filip Prokopyszyn (POL); Mia Griffin (IRL)
Track Cycling Challenge; Switzerland 17–18 December 2021	Elimination Race	Ethan Vernon (GBR); Neah Evans (GBR)	Szymon Sajnok (POL); Silvia Zanardi (ITA)	Simon Vitzthum (SUI); Léna Mettraux (SUI)
2021 Tasmania Carnivals: Devonport; Australia 29 December 2021
2021 Tasmania Carnivals: Devonport; Australia 29 December 2021	Keirin	Byron Davies (AUS); Kristina Clonan (AUS)	Conor Rowley (IRL); Lauren Perry (AUS)	Matthew Richardson (AUS); Sophie Edwards (AUS)
2021 Tasmania Carnivals: Devonport; Australia 29 December 2021	Scratch	Josh Duffy (AUS); Kristina Clonan (AUS)	Jensen Plowright (AUS); Georgia Baker (AUS)	Graeme Frislie (AUS); Maeve Plouffe (AUS)
2021 Tasmania Carnivals: Devonport; Australia 29 December 2021	Elimination Race	Liam Walsh (AUS); Alexandra Manly (AUS)	Jensen Plowright (AUS); Georgia Baker (AUS)	Josh Duffy (AUS); Maeve Plouffe (AUS)
Adelaide Track League - SFOC; Australia 21–22 January 2022
Adelaide Track League - SFOC; Australia 21–22 January 2022	Keirin	Matthew Glaetzer (AUS); Breanna Hargrave (AUS)	Carlos Carisimo (AUS); Kristina Clonan (AUS)	Ned Pollard (AUS); Ella Sibley (AUS)
Adelaide Track League - SFOC; Australia 21–22 January 2022	Omnium	Jensen Plowright (AUS); Maeve Plouffe (AUS)	Conor Leahy (AUS); Alexandra Martin-Wallace (AUS)	Graeme Frislie (AUS); Sophie Edwards (AUS)
Adelaide Track League - SFOC; Australia 21–22 January 2022	Men's Points Race	Conor Leahy (AUS)	Jensen Plowright (AUS)	Dalton Stretton (AUS)
Adelaide Track League - SFOC; Australia 21–22 January 2022	Men's Scratch	Oliver Bleddyn (AUS)	James Moriarty (AUS)	Graeme Frislie (AUS)
Adelaide Track League - SFOC; Australia 21–22 January 2022	Sprint	Matthew Richardson (AUS); Breanna Hargrave (AUS)	Matthew Glaetzer (AUS); Kristina Clonan (AUS)	Leigh Hoffman (AUS); Alessia McCaig (AUS)
Adelaide Track League - SFOC; Australia 21–22 January 2022	Men's Elimination Race	Jensen Plowright (AUS)	Blake Agnoletto (AUS)	Graeme Frislie (AUS)
Prova Internacional Município de Anadia; Portugal 21–23 January 2022
Prova Internacional Município de Anadia; Portugal 21–23 January 2022	Sprint	Jack Carlin (GBR); Laurine van Riessen (NED)	Joseph Truman (GBR); Anastasiya Sukhareva (RUS)	Vasilijus Lendel (LTU); Ekaterina Gnidenko (RUS)
Prova Internacional Município de Anadia; Portugal 21–23 January 2022	Individual Pursuit	Claudio Imhof (SUI); Anna Morris (GBR)	Ivo Oliveira (POR); Jade Labastugue (FRA)	Simon Vitzthum (SUI); Daniek Hengeveld (NED)
Prova Internacional Município de Anadia; Portugal 21–23 January 2022	Points Race	Thomas Boudat (FRA); Marie Le Net (FRA)	Simon Vitzthum (SUI); Gulnaz Khatuntseva (RUS)	Yoeri Havik (NED); Pfeiffer Georgi (GBR)
Prova Internacional Município de Anadia; Portugal 21–23 January 2022	Omnium	Matias Malmberg (DEN); Anita Stenberg (NOR)	Ivo Oliveira (POR); Pfeiffer Georgi (GBR)	Rui Oliveira (POR); Marie Le Net (FRA)
Prova Internacional Município de Anadia; Portugal 21–23 January 2022	Keirin	Joseph Truman (GBR); Laurine van Riessen (NED)	Vasilijus Lendel (LTU); Ekaterina Gnidenko (RUS)	Jack Carlin (GBR); Natalia Antonova (RUS)
Prova Internacional Município de Anadia; Portugal 21–23 January 2022	Scratch	Philip Heijnen (NED); Lonneke Uneken (NED)	Rodrigo Caixas (POR); Sophie Lewis (GBR)	Roy Eefting (NED); Maike van der Duin (NED)
Prova Internacional Município de Anadia; Portugal 21–23 January 2022	Km; 500 m	José Moreno Sánchez (ESP); Serafima Grishina (RUS)	Alejandro Martínez Chorro (ESP); Ekaterina Gnidenko (RUS)	Dmitry Nesterov (RUS); Laurine van Riessen (NED)
Prova Internacional Município de Anadia; Portugal 21–23 January 2022	Madison	Portugal I Rui Oliveira; Ivo Oliveira (Russia) Marathon–Tula; Gulnaz Khatuntseva; Diana Klimova	BEAT Cycling; Yoeri Havik; Vincent Hoppezak; Netherlands I Lonneke Uneken; Maike van der Duin	France; Thomas Boudat; Louis Pijourlet; United Kingdom; Sophie Lewis; Pfeiffer Georgi
Life's an Omnium; Switzerland 24 February 2022
Life's an Omnium; Switzerland 24 February 2022	Women's Omnium	Anita Stenberg (NOR)	Lily Williams (USA)	Gulnaz Khatuntseva (RUS)
Life's an Omnium; Switzerland 24 February 2022	Men's Points Race	Yoeri Havik (NED)	Philip Heijnen (NED)	Ryan Schilt (NED)
Life's an Omnium; Switzerland 24 February 2022	Men's Scratch	Roy Eefting (NED)	Yoeri Havik (NED)	Dominik Bieler (SUI)
Life's an Omnium; Switzerland 24 February 2022	Men's Elimination Race	Roy Eefting (NED)	Yoeri Havik (NED)	Simon Vitzthum (SUI)

== National Championships ==
=== Individuals ===
==== Individual Pursuit ====
Date	Venue	Podium (Men)	Podium (Women)
28–31 October 2021	Indonesia; Bandung	Dealton Prayogo	Liontin Evangelina Setiawan
28–31 October 2021	Indonesia; Bandung	Projo Waseso	Ananda Diva Saputri
28–31 October 2021	Indonesia; Bandung	Roy Aldrie Widhijanto	Gita Widya Yunika
29–31 October 2021	Slovenia; Novo Mesto	Matic Žumer	Ana Ahačič
29–31 October 2021	Slovenia; Novo Mesto	Marko Pavlič	Tjaša Sušnik
29–31 October 2021	Slovenia; Novo Mesto	Kristjan Hočevar	Ema Žibert
30–31 October 2021	Norway; Sola	Sindre Haugsvær	Nora Tveit
30–31 October 2021	Norway; Sola	Erlend Litlere	Birgitte Andersen Nilssen
30–31 October 2021	Norway; Sola	Sondre Peder Kristensen	—
6–7 November 2021	Hungary; Novo Mesto (Slovenia)	Viktor Filutás	Johanna Kitti Borissza
6–7 November 2021	Hungary; Novo Mesto (Slovenia)	Krisztián Lovassy	Szonja Kapott
6–7 November 2021	Hungary; Novo Mesto (Slovenia)	Olivér Móré-Gosselin	Zsófia Szabó
27–28 November 2021	Sweden; Falun	Mathias Thunmarker	—
27–28 November 2021	Sweden; Falun	Gustav Johansson	—
27–28 November 2021	Sweden; Falun	Jacob Wihk	—
9–12 December 2021	Japan; Shizuoka	Shunsuke Imamura	Kie Furuyama
9–12 December 2021	Japan; Shizuoka	Koshin Adachi	Mio Taroda
9–12 December 2021	Japan; Shizuoka	Shoi Matsuda	Nao Itsumida
9–12 December 2021	Chile; Peñalolén	Alejandro Soto	Aranza Villalón
9–12 December 2021	Chile; Peñalolén	Matías Arriagada	Daniela Guajardo
9–12 December 2021	Chile; Peñalolén	Felipe Pizarro	Paula Villalón
13–16 December 2021	Malaysia; Nilai	Chun Kiat Lim	Nur Aisyah Mohamad Zubir
13–16 December 2021	Malaysia; Nilai	Wen Chun Waldron Chee	Nurqadrina Emylia Norzali
13–16 December 2021	Malaysia; Nilai	Ariff Danial Noor Roseidi	Ezzatie Fifiyana Shazwanie Shaiful Hisham
18–19 December 2021	Czech Republic; Prague	Denis Rugovac	—
18–19 December 2021	Czech Republic; Prague	Nicolas Pietrula	—
18–19 December 2021	Czech Republic; Prague	Jan Voneš	—
24–28 December 2021	India; Jaipur	Vishavjeet Singh	Meenakshi Sharma
24–28 December 2021	India; Jaipur	Venkappa Kengalagutti	Swasti Singh
24–28 December 2021	India; Jaipur	Punam Chand	Khoirom Rejiya Devi
27–29 December 2021	Netherlands; Apeldoorn	Brian Megens	Daniek Hengeveld
27–29 December 2021	Netherlands; Apeldoorn	Maikel Zijlaard	Juliet Eickhof
27–29 December 2021	Netherlands; Apeldoorn	Patrick Bos	Tessa Dijksman
4 – 6 February 2022	Slovenia; Novo Mesto	Matic Žumer	[[]]
4 – 6 February 2022	Slovenia; Novo Mesto	Mihael Štajnar	[[]]
4 – 6 February 2022	Slovenia; Novo Mesto	Nik Čemažar	[[]]

==== Individual Keirin ====
Date	Venue	Podium (Men)	Podium (Women)
28–31 October 2021	Indonesia; Bandung	Reno Yudho Sansaka	—
28–31 October 2021	Indonesia; Bandung	Muhammad Nur Fathoni	—
28–31 October 2021	Indonesia; Bandung	Puguh Admadi	—
6–7 November 2021	Hungary; Novo Mesto (Slovenia)	Sándor Szalontay	—
6–7 November 2021	Hungary; Novo Mesto (Slovenia)	Viktor Filutás	—
6–7 November 2021	Hungary; Novo Mesto (Slovenia)	Gergő Orosz	—
13 November 2021	Jamaica; Kingston	Brandon Reid	—
13 November 2021	Jamaica; Kingston	Daniel Palmer	—
13 November 2021	Jamaica; Kingston	Malik Reid	—
18–21 November 2021	Brazil; Maringá	João Vitor Silva	Tatielle Valadares
18–21 November 2021	Brazil; Maringá	Fernando Sikora	Julia Maria Constantino
18–21 November 2021	Brazil; Maringá	Leandro de Larmelina	Bruna Lie Adate
19–20 November 2021	Lithuania; Panevėžys (Lithuania)	Vasilijus Lendel	Simona Krupeckaitė
19–20 November 2021	Lithuania; Panevėžys (Lithuania)	Justas Beniušis	—
19–20 November 2021	Lithuania; Panevėžys (Lithuania)	Aivaras Naujokaitis	—
19–20 November 2021	Latvia; Panevėžys (Lithuania)	Ainārs Ķiksis	—
19–20 November 2021	Latvia; Panevėžys (Lithuania)	Jānis Rubiks	—
19–20 November 2021	Latvia; Panevėžys (Lithuania)	Kristaps Knops	—
2 December 2021	Denmark; Ballerup	Oskar Ulrik Winkler	—
2 December 2021	Denmark; Ballerup	Rasmus Bøgh Wallin	—
2 December 2021	Denmark; Ballerup	Christoffer Bohn	—
9–12 December 2021	Japan; Shizuoka	Yuta Obara	Yuka Kobayashi
9–12 December 2021	Japan; Shizuoka	Shinji Nakano	Fuko Umekawa
9–12 December 2021	Japan; Shizuoka	Yuki Murata	Uta Kume
9–12 December 2021	Chile; Peñalolén	Felipe Peñaloza	Aranza Villalón
9–12 December 2021	Chile; Peñalolén	Antonio Cabrera	Scarlet Cortés
9–12 December 2021	Chile; Peñalolén	Pablo Gómez	Camila García
13–16 December 2021	Malaysia; Nilai	Muhammad Shah Firdaus Sahrom	—
13–16 December 2021	Malaysia; Nilai	Muhammad Alif Fahmy Khairul Anuar	—
13–16 December 2021	Malaysia; Nilai	Ahmad Safwan Ahmad Nazeri	—
24–28 December 2021	India; Jaipur	Ronaldo Laitonjam	Mayuri Lute
24–28 December 2021	India; Jaipur	Amarjeet Singh Nagi	Sonali Chanu
24–28 December 2021	India; Jaipur	Mayur Pawar	Deborah Herold
27–29 December 2021	Netherlands; Apeldoorn	Harrie Lavreysen	Laurine van Riessen
27–29 December 2021	Netherlands; Apeldoorn	Sam Ligtlee	Hetty van de Wouw
27–29 December 2021	Netherlands; Apeldoorn	Tijmen van Loon	Lonneke Geraerts
4 – 6 February 2022	Slovenia; Novo Mesto	Eduard Žalar	[[]]
4 – 6 February 2022	Slovenia; Novo Mesto	Maks Cvjetičanin	[[]]
4 – 6 February 2022	Slovenia; Novo Mesto	Boštjan Murn	[[]]
30 July 2022	United States; Breinigsville, Pennsylvania	Andrew Chu	Jennifer Valente
30 July 2022	United States; Breinigsville, Pennsylvania	Barak Pipkins	Mandy Marquardt
30 July 2022	United States; Breinigsville, Pennsylvania	Sandor Delgado	Jennifer Wagner

==== Individual Sprint ====
Date	Venue	Podium (Men)	Podium (Women)
28–31 October 2021	Indonesia; Bandung	Puguh Admadi	Ratu Afifah Nur Indah
28–31 October 2021	Indonesia; Bandung	Reno Yudho Sansaka	Wiji Lestari
28–31 October 2021	Indonesia; Bandung	Lutfi Bahari	Ni'mal Maghfiroh
29–31 October 2021	Slovenia; Novo Mesto	Anže Skok	—
29–31 October 2021	Slovenia; Novo Mesto	Eduard Žalar	—
29–31 October 2021	Slovenia; Novo Mesto	Matevž Govekar	—
30–31 October 2021	Norway; Sola	Aasmund Groven Lindtveit	Anita Stenberg
30–31 October 2021	Norway; Sola	Sebastian Kartfjord	Nora Tveit
30–31 October 2021	Norway; Sola	Sindre Haugsvær	Pernille Feldmann
6–7 November 2021	Hungary; Novo Mesto (Slovenia)	Sándor Szalontay	—
6–7 November 2021	Hungary; Novo Mesto (Slovenia)	Viktor Filutás	—
6–7 November 2021	Hungary; Novo Mesto (Slovenia)	Krisztián Lovassy	—
13 November 2021	Jamaica; Kingston	Malik Reid	—
13 November 2021	Jamaica; Kingston	Ricardo Lynch	—
13 November 2021	Jamaica; Kingston	Daniel Palmer	—
18–21 November 2021	Brazil; Maringá	João Vitor Silva	Carolina Barbosa
18–21 November 2021	Brazil; Maringá	Flávio Cipriano	Tatiele Valadares
18–21 November 2021	Brazil; Maringá	Vinicius Rangel	Maria Tereza Müller
19–20 November 2021	Lithuania; Panevėžys (Lithuania)	Vasilijus Lendel	—
19–20 November 2021	Lithuania; Panevėžys (Lithuania)	Justas Beniušis	—
19–20 November 2021	Lithuania; Panevėžys (Lithuania)	Valdas Šakūnas	—
19–20 November 2021	Latvia; Panevėžys (Lithuania)	Ainārs Ķiksis	—
19–20 November 2021	Latvia; Panevėžys (Lithuania)	Jānis Rubiks	—
19–20 November 2021	Latvia; Panevėžys (Lithuania)	Kristaps Knops	—
27–28 November 2021	Sweden; Falun	Christoffer Eriksson	—
27–28 November 2021	Sweden; Falun	Mathias Thunmarker	—
27–28 November 2021	Sweden; Falun	Sven Westergren	—
9–12 December 2021	Japan; Shizuoka	Kohei Terasaki	Fuko Umekawa
9–12 December 2021	Japan; Shizuoka	Kyohei Shinzan	Yuka Kobayashi
9–12 December 2021	Japan; Shizuoka	Shinji Nakano	Uta Kume
9–12 December 2021	Chile; Peñalolén	Felipe Monardes	Daniela Colilef
9–12 December 2021	Chile; Peñalolén	Vicente Ramírez	Renata Urrutia
9–12 December 2021	Chile; Peñalolén	Joaquín Fuenzalida	Paula Molina
24–28 December 2021	India; Jaipur	Ronaldo Laitonjam	Mayuri Lute
24–28 December 2021	India; Jaipur	Yanglem Rojit Singh	Deborah Herold
24–28 December 2021	India; Jaipur	Abhindu A	Swasti Singh
27–29 December 2021	Netherlands; Apeldoorn	Harrie Lavreysen	Laurine van Riessen
27–29 December 2021	Netherlands; Apeldoorn	Sam Ligtlee	Steffie van der Peet
27–29 December 2021	Netherlands; Apeldoorn	Tijmen van Loon	Hetty van de Wouw
2 January	Belgium; Ghent	Arthur Senrame	Gold medal
2 January	Belgium; Ghent	Renzo Raes	Silver medal
2 January	Belgium; Ghent	Mathias Lefeber	Bronze medal
4 – 6 February 2022	Slovenia; Novo Mesto	Jaka Špoljar	[[]]
4 – 6 February 2022	Slovenia; Novo Mesto	Anže Skok	[[]]
4 – 6 February 2022	Slovenia; Novo Mesto	Matevž Govekar	[[]]
29 July 2022	United States; Breinigsville, Pennsylvania	James Alvord III	Mandy Marquardt
29 July 2022	United States; Breinigsville, Pennsylvania	Sandor Delgado	Jennifer Wagner
29 July 2022	United States; Breinigsville, Pennsylvania	Andrew Chu	Stephanie Lawrence

==== Individual Time Trial ====
Date	Venue	Podium (Men)	Podium (Women)
28–31 October 2021	Indonesia; Bandung	Muhammad Nur Fathoni	Wiji Lestari
28–31 October 2021	Indonesia; Bandung	Reno Yudho Sansaka	Ratu Afifah Nur Indah
28–31 October 2021	Indonesia; Bandung	Puguh Admadi	Ananda Diva Saputri
29–31 October 2021	Slovenia; Novo Mesto	Anže Skok	Ana Ahačič
29–31 October 2021	Slovenia; Novo Mesto	Matevž Govekar	Ema Žibert
29–31 October 2021	Slovenia; Novo Mesto	Eduard Žalar	Tjaša Sušnik
30–31 October 2021	Norway; Sola	Aasmund Groven Lindtveit	Nora Tveit
30–31 October 2021	Norway; Sola	Sindre Haugsvær	Birgitte Andersen Nilssen
30–31 October 2021	Norway; Sola	Roger Schei Bergheim	—
6–7 November 2021	Hungary; Novo Mesto (Slovenia)	Sándor Szalontay	Zsófia Szabó
6–7 November 2021	Hungary; Novo Mesto (Slovenia)	Viktor Filutás	Johanna Kitti Borissza
6–7 November 2021	Hungary; Novo Mesto (Slovenia)	Márton Solymosi	Szonja Kapott
13 November 2021	Jamaica; Kingston	—	Liori Sharpe
13 November 2021	Jamaica; Kingston	—	Elisabeth Mondon
13 November 2021	Jamaica; Kingston	—	—
27–28 November 2021	Sweden; Falun	Christoffer Eriksson	—
27–28 November 2021	Sweden; Falun	Jacob Wihk	—
27–28 November 2021	Sweden; Falun	Mathias Thunmarker	—
9–12 December 2021	Japan; Shizuoka	Yudai Nitta	Uta Kume
9–12 December 2021	Japan; Shizuoka	Yuta Obara	Mio Nakanishi
9–12 December 2021	Japan; Shizuoka	Kyohei Shinzan	—
9–12 December 2021	Chile; Peñalolén	Vicente Ramírez	Daniela Colilef
9–12 December 2021	Chile; Peñalolén	Felipe Monardes	Renata Urrutia
9–12 December 2021	Chile; Peñalolén	Pablo Gómez	Paula Molina
24–28 December 2021	India; Jaipur	Ronaldo Laitonjam	Alena Reji
24–28 December 2021	India; Jaipur	Amarjeet Singh Nagi	Shushikala Agashe
24–28 December 2021	India; Jaipur	Sahil Kumar	Mayuri Lute
27–29 December 2021	Netherlands; Apeldoorn	Tijmen van Loon	Steffie van der Peet
27–29 December 2021	Netherlands; Apeldoorn	Daan Kool	Kyra Lamberink
27–29 December 2021	Netherlands; Apeldoorn	Lars Romijn	Hetty van de Wouw
4 – 6 February 2022	Slovenia; Novo Mesto	Eduard Žalar	[[]]
4 – 6 February 2022	Slovenia; Novo Mesto	Maks Cvjetičanin	[[]]
4 – 6 February 2022	Slovenia; Novo Mesto	Boštjan Murn	[[]]
27 July 2022	United States; Breinigsville, Pennsylvania	James Alvord III	Mandy Marquardt
27 July 2022	United States; Breinigsville, Pennsylvania	David Domonoske	Jennifer Wagner
27 July 2022	United States; Breinigsville, Pennsylvania	Dyllon Gunsolus	Emily Schelberg

==== Individual Elimination Race ====
Date	Venue	Podium (Men)	Podium (Women)
29–31 October 2021	Slovenia; Novo Mesto (2021 Edition)	Matevž Govekar	Ana Ahačič
29–31 October 2021	Slovenia; Novo Mesto (2021 Edition)	Gal Glivar	Tjaša Sušnik
29–31 October 2021	Slovenia; Novo Mesto (2021 Edition)	Luka Ziherl	Ema Žibert
30–31 October 2021	Norway; Sola	Sindre Haugsvær	Anita Stenberg
30–31 October 2021	Norway; Sola	Tore Vabø	Nora Tveit
30–31 October 2021	Norway; Sola	Andreas Vileid Kleive	Birgitte Andersen Nilssen
18–21 November 2021	Brazil; Maringá	Ricardo Dalamaria	Ana Paula Casetta
18–21 November 2021	Brazil; Maringá	Ewerton Eduardo Vieira	Larissa Castelari
18–21 November 2021	Brazil; Maringá	Kacio Fonseca	Amanda Kunkel
21 November 2021	Jamaica; Kingston	Alex Morgan	—
21 November 2021	Jamaica; Kingston	Daniel Palmer	—
21 November 2021	Jamaica; Kingston	Stephen McCalla	—
9–12 December 2021	Japan; Shizuoka	Shunsuke Imamura	Nao Suzuki
9–12 December 2021	Japan; Shizuoka	Eiya Hashimoto	Tsuyaka Uchino
9–12 December 2021	Japan; Shizuoka	Daiki Magosaki	Kie Furuyama
18–19 December 2021	Czech Republic; Prague	Jan Voneš	Petra Ševčíková
18–19 December 2021	Czech Republic; Prague	Štěpán Široký	Jarmila Machačová
18–19 December 2021	Czech Republic; Prague	Denis Rugovac	Veronika Bartoníková
27–29 December 2021	Netherlands; Apeldoorn	Yoeri Havik	Marit Raaijmakers
27–29 December 2021	Netherlands; Apeldoorn	Yanne Dorenbos	Daniek Hengeveld
27–29 December 2021	Netherlands; Apeldoorn	Vincent Hoppezak	Amber van der Hulst
29 December 2021	Belgium; Ghent	Arthur Senrame	Gold medal
29 December 2021	Belgium; Ghent	Thibaut Bernard	Silver medal
29 December 2021	Belgium; Ghent	Renzo Raes	Bronze medal
4 – 6 February 2022	Slovenia; Novo Mesto	Luka Ziherl	Gold medal
4 – 6 February 2022	Slovenia; Novo Mesto	Gal Glivar	Silver medal
4 – 6 February 2022	Slovenia; Novo Mesto	Matevž Govekar	Bronze medal
26 – 27 February 2022	Portugal; Anadia	Gold medal	Maria Martins
26 – 27 February 2022	Portugal; Anadia	Silver medal	Daniela Campos
26 – 27 February 2022	Portugal; Anadia	Bronze medal	Beatriz Roxo

==== Individual Scratch Race ====
Date	Venue	Podium (Men)	Podium (Women)
29–31 October 2021	Slovenia; Novo Mesto	Anže Skok	Ana Ahačič
29–31 October 2021	Slovenia; Novo Mesto	Luka Ziherl	Tjaša Sušnik
29–31 October 2021	Slovenia; Novo Mesto	Blaž Avbelj	Ema Žibert
30–31 October 2021	Norway; Sola	Sindre Haugsvær	Anita Stenberg
30–31 October 2021	Norway; Sola	Tore Vabø	Nora Tveit
30–31 October 2021	Norway; Sola	Kristoffer Forus	Pernille Feldmann
6–7 November 2021	Hungary; Novo Mesto (Slovenia)	Krisztián Lovassy	Zsófia Szabó
6–7 November 2021	Hungary; Novo Mesto (Slovenia)	Viktor Filutás	Johanna Kitti Borissza
6–7 November 2021	Hungary; Novo Mesto (Slovenia)	Miklós Durucz	Anna Túri
19–20 November 2021	Lithuania; Panevėžys (Lithuania)	Justas Beniušis	Olivija Baleišytė
19–20 November 2021	Lithuania; Panevėžys (Lithuania)	Venantas Lašinis	Simona Krupeckaitė
19–20 November 2021	Lithuania; Panevėžys (Lithuania)	Žygimantas Matuzevičius	—
19–20 November 2021	Latvia; Panevėžys (Lithuania)	Ainārs Ķiksis	—
19–20 November 2021	Latvia; Panevėžys (Lithuania)	Vitālijs Korņilovs	—
19–20 November 2021	Latvia; Panevėžys (Lithuania)	Jānis Rubiks	—
21 November 2021	Jamaica; Kingston	Alex Morgan	—
21 November 2021	Jamaica; Kingston	Stephen McCalla	—
21 November 2021	Jamaica; Kingston	Horace McFarlane	—
9–12 December 2021	Japan; Shizuoka	Shunsuke Imamura	Nao Suzuki
9–12 December 2021	Japan; Shizuoka	Eiya Hashimoto	Kisato Nakamura
9–12 December 2021	Japan; Shizuoka	Kenta Yachi	Anna Iwamoto
9–12 December 2021	Chile; Peñalolén	Antonio Cabrera	Aranza Villalón
9–12 December 2021	Chile; Peñalolén	Cristián Arriagada	Scarlet Cortés
9–12 December 2021	Chile; Peñalolén	Alejandro Soto	Camila García
24–28 December 2021	India; Jaipur	Krishna Nayakodi	Gold medal
24–28 December 2021	India; Jaipur	Naman Kapil	Silver medal
24–28 December 2021	India; Jaipur	Ashwini Jitendra Patil	Bronze medal
27–29 December 2021	Netherlands; Apeldoorn	Yoeri Havik	Amber van der Hulst
27–29 December 2021	Netherlands; Apeldoorn	Vincent Hoppezak	Marit Raaijmakers
27–29 December 2021	Netherlands; Apeldoorn	Philip Heijnen	Marjolein van 't Geloof
4 – 6 February 2022	Slovenia; Novo Mesto	Anže Skok	[[]]
4 – 6 February 2022	Slovenia; Novo Mesto	Matevž Govekar	[[]]
4 – 6 February 2022	Slovenia; Novo Mesto	Aljaž Jarc	[[]]
5 – 6 February 2022	Belgium; Ghent	Jules Hesters	Marith Vanhove
5 – 6 February 2022	Belgium; Ghent	Milan Fretin	Katrijn De Clercq
5 – 6 February 2022	Belgium; Ghent	Tuur Dens	Sara Maes
26 – 27 February 2022	Portugal; Anadia	Iúri Leitão	Maria Martins
26 – 27 February 2022	Portugal; Anadia	Diogo Narciso	Daniela Campos
26 – 27 February 2022	Portugal; Anadia	Rodrigo Caixas	Beatriz Roxo

==== Individual Points Race ====
Date	Venue	Podium (Men)	Podium (Women)
29–31 October 2021	Slovenia; Novo Mesto	Matevž Govekar	Ana Ahačič
29–31 October 2021	Slovenia; Novo Mesto	Anže Skok	Ema Žibert
29–31 October 2021	Slovenia; Novo Mesto	David Per	Tjaša Sušnik
30–31 October 2021	Norway; Sola	Sindre Haugsvær	Anita Stenberg
30–31 October 2021	Norway; Sola	Tore Vabø	Nora Tveit
30–31 October 2021	Norway; Sola	Erlend Litlere	Pernille Feldmann
6–7 November 2021	Hungary; Novo Mesto (Slovenia)	Viktor Filutás	Johanna Kitti Borissza
6–7 November 2021	Hungary; Novo Mesto (Slovenia)	Krisztián Lovassy	Zsófia Szabó
6–7 November 2021	Hungary; Novo Mesto (Slovenia)	Bertold Drijver	Anna Túri
19–20 November 2021	Lithuania; Panevėžys (Lithuania)	Justas Beniušis	Olivija Baleišytė
19–20 November 2021	Lithuania; Panevėžys (Lithuania)	Mantas Bitinas	—
19–20 November 2021	Lithuania; Panevėžys (Lithuania)	Ramūnas Navardauskas	—
19–20 November 2021	Latvia; Panevėžys (Lithuania)	Vitālijs Korņilovs	—
19–20 November 2021	Latvia; Panevėžys (Lithuania)	Kristians Belohvsciks	—
19–20 November 2021	Latvia; Panevėžys (Lithuania)	Kristaps Knops	—
21 November 2021	Jamaica; Kingston	Andrew Ramsey	—
21 November 2021	Jamaica; Kingston	Stephen McCalla	—
21 November 2021	Jamaica; Kingston	Marlowe Rodman	—
27–28 November 2021	Sweden; Falun	Gustav Johansson	—
27–28 November 2021	Sweden; Falun	Jacob Wihk	—
27–28 November 2021	Sweden; Falun	Mathias Thunmarker	—
2 December 2021	Denmark; Ballerup	Andreas Stokbro	Amalie Dideriksen
2 December 2021	Denmark; Ballerup	Tobias Hansen	Ellen Hjøllund Klinge
2 December 2021	Denmark; Ballerup	Mathias Larsen	Michelle Lauge Quaade
9–12 December 2021	Japan; Shizuoka	Shunsuke Imamura	Tsuyaka Uchino
9–12 December 2021	Japan; Shizuoka	Naoki Kojima	Kie Furuyama
9–12 December 2021	Japan; Shizuoka	Tetsuo Yamamoto	Nao Suzuki
9–12 December 2021	Chile; Peñalolén	Felipe Peñaloza	Paula Villalón
9–12 December 2021	Chile; Peñalolén	Matías Arriagada	Paola Muñoz
9–12 December 2021	Chile; Peñalolén	Alejandro Soto	Francisca Donoso
18–19 December 2021	Czech Republic; Prague	Denis Rugovac	—
18–19 December 2021	Czech Republic; Prague	Nicolas Pietrula	—
18–19 December 2021	Czech Republic; Prague	Adam Křenek	—
24–28 December 2021	India; Jaipur	Gold medal	Irom Matouleibi Devi
24–28 December 2021	India; Jaipur	Silver medal	Meenakshi Sharma
24–28 December 2021	India; Jaipur	Bronze medal	Monika Jat
27–29 December 2021	Netherlands; Apeldoorn	Yoeri Havik	Daniek Hengeveld
27–29 December 2021	Netherlands; Apeldoorn	Philip Heijnen	Juliet Eickhof
27–29 December 2021	Netherlands; Apeldoorn	Yanne Dorenbos	Marit Raaijmakers
4 – 6 February 2022	Slovenia; Novo Mesto	Anže Skok	[[]]
4 – 6 February 2022	Slovenia; Novo Mesto	Luka Ziherl	[[]]
4 – 6 February 2022	Slovenia; Novo Mesto	Aljaž Jarc	[[]]

==== Individual Omnium ====
Date	Venue	Podium (Men)	Podium (Women)
28–31 October 2021	Indonesia; Bandung	Terry Kusuma	—
28–31 October 2021	Indonesia; Bandung	Bernard Benyamin van Aert	—
28–31 October 2021	Indonesia; Bandung	Angga Dwi Wahyu Prahesta	—
29–31 October 2021	Slovenia; Novo Mesto	Anže Skok	Ana Ahačič
29–31 October 2021	Slovenia; Novo Mesto	Gal Galivar	Ema Žibert
29–31 October 2021	Slovenia; Novo Mesto	Matevž Govekar	Tjaša Sušnik
30–31 October 2021	Norway; Sola	Sindre Haugsvær	Anita Stenberg
30–31 October 2021	Norway; Sola	Tore Vabø	Nora Tveit
30–31 October 2021	Norway; Sola	Erlend Litlere	Pernille Feldmann
6–7 November 2021	Hungary; Novo Mesto (Slovenia)	Viktor Filutás	Johanna Kitti Borissza
6–7 November 2021	Hungary; Novo Mesto (Slovenia)	Krisztián Lovassy	Zsófia Szabó
6–7 November 2021	Hungary; Novo Mesto (Slovenia)	Bertold Drijver	Anna Túri
18–21 November 2021	Brazil; Maringá	Lauro Chaman	Alice Melo
18–21 November 2021	Brazil; Maringá	Cristian Egídio	Larissa Castelari
18–21 November 2021	Brazil; Maringá	Armando Camargo	Wellyda Rodrigues
19–20 November 2021	Lithuania; Panevėžys (Lithuania)	Justas Beniušis	Simona Krupeckaitė
19–20 November 2021	Lithuania; Panevėžys (Lithuania)	Rokas Kmieliauskas	—
19–20 November 2021	Lithuania; Panevėžys (Lithuania)	Mantas Bitinas	—
19–20 November 2021	Latvia; Panevėžys (Lithuania)	Vitālijs Korņilovs	—
19–20 November 2021	Latvia; Panevėžys (Lithuania)	Kristaps Knops	—
19–20 November 2021	Latvia; Panevėžys (Lithuania)	Kristians Belohvosciks	—
21 November 2021	Jamaica; Kingston	Alex Morgan	—
21 November 2021	Jamaica; Kingston	Stephen McCalla	—
21 November 2021	Jamaica; Kingston	Andrew Ramsey	—
4 December 2021	Denmark; Odense	Tobias Hansen	Amalie Dideriksen
4 December 2021	Denmark; Odense	Rasmus Pedersen	Michelle Lauge Quaade
4 December 2021	Denmark; Odense	Robin Skivild	Karoline Hemmsen
11–12 December 2021	Czech Republic; Prague	Denis Rugovac	Petra Ševčíková
11–12 December 2021	Czech Republic; Prague	Adam Křenek	Jarmila Machačová
11–12 December 2021	Czech Republic; Prague	Jan Voneš	Kateřina Kohoutková
9–12 December 2021	Japan; Shizuoka	Naoki Kojima	Nao Suzuki
9–12 December 2021	Japan; Shizuoka	Shunsuke Imamura	Tsuyaka Uchino
9–12 December 2021	Japan; Shizuoka	Eiya Hashimoto	Kie Furuyama
17–19 December 2021	New Zealand; Cambridge	Regan Gough	Ally Wollaston
17–19 December 2021	New Zealand; Cambridge	George Jackson	Bryony Botha
17–19 December 2021	New Zealand; Cambridge	Hugo Jones	Jessie Hodges
24–28 December 2021	India; Jaipur	Vishavjeet Singh	—
24–28 December 2021	India; Jaipur	Satbir Singh	—
24–28 December 2021	India; Jaipur	Harshveer Singh	—
4 – 6 February 2022	Slovenia; Novo Mesto	Jaka Špoljar	[[]]
4 – 6 February 2022	Slovenia; Novo Mesto	Tilen Finkšt	[[]]
4 – 6 February 2022	Slovenia; Novo Mesto	Matevž Govekar	[[]]
5 – 6 February 2022	Belgium; Ghent	Fabio Van den Bossche	Katrijn De Clercq
5 – 6 February 2022	Belgium; Ghent	Robbe Ghys	Lani Wittevrongel
5 – 6 February 2022	Belgium; Ghent	Jules Hesters	Marith Vanhove
13 February 2022	Netherlands; Alkmaar	Vincent Hoppezak	Mylène de Zoete
13 February 2022	Netherlands; Alkmaar	Roy Eefting	Marit Raaijmakers
13 February 2022	Netherlands; Alkmaar	Philip Heijnen	Juliet Eickhof
19 – 20 February 2022	Spain; Palma de Mallorca	Sebastián Mora	Tania Calvo
19 – 20 February 2022	Spain; Palma de Mallorca	Xavier Cañellas	Laura Rodríguez Cordero
19 – 20 February 2022	Spain; Palma de Mallorca	Erik Martorell	Naia Amondarain

==== Individual Madison ====
Date	Venue	Podium (Men)	Podium (Women)
6–7 November 2021	Hungary; Novo Mesto (Slovenia)	Viktor Filutás; Krisztián Lovassy	Anna Túri; Johanna Kitti Borissza
6–7 November 2021	Hungary; Novo Mesto (Slovenia)	Gergő Orosz; Márton Solymosi	Zsófia Szabó; Szonja Kapott
6–7 November 2021	Hungary; Novo Mesto (Slovenia)	Bertold Drijver; Olivér Móré-Gosselin	Andrea Tircsi; Diána Letti Hérincs
12–14 November 2021	United States; Detroit	John Croom; Tristan Manderfeld	Makayla MacPherson; Chloe Patrick
12–14 November 2021	United States; Detroit	Ryan Jastrab; Kyle Perry	Alison Merner; Emma Jimenez Palos
12–14 November 2021	United States; Detroit	Dan Breuer; Lucas Strain	Autumn Caya; Stephanie Lawrence
18–21 November 2021	Brazil; Maringá	Fábio Dalamaria; Ricardo Dalamaria	Alice Leite; Wellyda Rodrigues
18–21 November 2021	Brazil; Maringá	Kacio Fonseca; Armando Camargo	Yana Camargo; Nicolle Wendy Borges
18–21 November 2021	Brazil; Maringá	Luan Rodrigues Silva; Otávio Gonzeli	Ana Paula Casetta; Talita Oliveira
9 December 2021	Denmark; Ballerup	Matias Malmberg; Rasmus Pedersen	Amalie Dideriksen; Karoline Hemmsen
9 December 2021	Denmark; Ballerup	Anders Fynbo; Arne Birkemose	Michelle Lauge Quaade; Amalie Winther Olsen
9 December 2021	Denmark; Ballerup	Conrad Haugsted; Theodor Storm	Anna Hansen; Solbjørk Minke Anderson
9–12 December 2021	Japan; Shizuoka	Shunsuke Imamura; Tetsuo Yamamoto	Nao Suzuki; Tsuyaka Uchino
9–12 December 2021	Japan; Shizuoka	Eiya Hashimoto; Naoki Kojima	Kisato Nakamura; Kie Furuyama
9–12 December 2021	Japan; Shizuoka	Takeru Sato; Satoshi Takahashi	Anna Iwamoto; Yui Ishida
13–16 December 2021	New Zealand; Cambridge	Regan Gough; Thomas Sexton	Jessie Hodges; Ally Wollaston
13–16 December 2021	New Zealand; Cambridge	Daniel Bridgwater; Nick Kergozou	Michaela Drummond; Nicole Shields
13–16 December 2021	New Zealand; Cambridge	Carne Groube; Hugo Jones	Bryony Botha; Emma Cumming
27–29 December 2021	Netherlands; Apeldoorn	Yoeri Havik; Cees Bol	Nina Kessler; Marjolein van 't Geloof
27–29 December 2021	Netherlands; Apeldoorn	Philip Heijnen; Vincent Hoppezak	Amber van der Hulst; Daniek Hengeveld
27–29 December 2021	Netherlands; Apeldoorn	Raymond Kreder; Ramon Sinkeldam	Marit Raaijmakers; Lorena Wiebes
4 – 6 February 2022	Slovenia; Novo Mesto	Žak Eržen; Anže Ravbar	[[]]
4 – 6 February 2022	Slovenia; Novo Mesto	Jaka Špoljar; Tilen Finkšt	[[]]
4 – 6 February 2022	Slovenia; Novo Mesto	Anže Skok; Matevž Govekar	[[]]
5 – 6 February 2022	Belgium; Ghent	Jules Hesters; Tuur Dens	Gold medal
5 – 6 February 2022	Belgium; Ghent	Robbe Ghys; Fabio Van den Bossche	Silver medal
5 – 6 February 2022	Belgium; Ghent	Arthur Senrame; Maxwell De Broeder	Bronze medal
19 – 20 February 2022	Spain; Palma de Mallorca	Iker Bonillo; Sebastián Mora	Naia Amondarain; Tania Calvo
19 – 20 February 2022	Spain; Palma de Mallorca	Xavier Cañellas; Pau Llaneras	Eva Anguela; Isabella Escalera
19 – 20 February 2022	Spain; Palma de Mallorca	Erik Martorell; Marcel Pallares	Ziortza Isasi; Ana Usabiaga
26 – 27 February 2022	Portugal; Anadia	João Matias; Iúri Leitão	Gold medal
26 – 27 February 2022	Portugal; Anadia	Diogo Narciso; Rodrigo Caixas	Silver medal
26 – 27 February 2022	Portugal; Anadia	Francisco Marques; Daniel Dias	Bronze medal

==== Teams ====
===== Team Sprint =====
Date	Venue	Podium (Men)	Podium (Women)
29–31 October 2021	Slovenia; Novo Mesto	Anže Skok; Tilen Finkšt; Blaž Avbelj	— — —
29–31 October 2021	Slovenia; Novo Mesto	David Per; Boštjan Murn; Žiga Horvat	— — —
29–31 October 2021	Slovenia; Novo Mesto	Mihael Štajnar; Robert Jenko; Luka Čotar	— — —
13 November 2021	Jamaica; Kingston	Fitzroy Walters; Wayne Palmer; Marloe Rodman	— — —
13 November 2021	Jamaica; Kingston	Andrade Daley; Kevan Pryce; Alex Morgan	— — —
13 November 2021	Jamaica; Kingston	— — —	— — —
18–21 November 2021	Brazil; Maringá	João Vitor Silva; Daniel Gruer de Brito; Mauro Aquino	Talita Oliveira; Thayná Araújo de Lima; Maria Tereza Müller
18–21 November 2021	Brazil; Maringá	Gabriel Masotti; Kacio Fonseca; Ricardo Alafim Freitas	Amanda Kunkel; Gabriela Yumi; Bruna Lie Adati
18–21 November 2021	Brazil; Maringá	Geovane Ferreira; Gustavo de Oliveira da Silva; Vinícius Guimarães da Cruz	Nicolle Wendy Borges; Carolina Barbosa Alves; Silvia da Silva
19–20 November 2021	Lithuania; Panevėžys (Lithuania)	Airidas Videika; Aivaras Naujokaitis; Mantas Januškevičius	— — — —
19–20 November 2021	Lithuania; Panevėžys (Lithuania)	Mindaugas Striška; Darijus Džervus; Ramūnas Navardauskas	— — — —
19–20 November 2021	Lithuania; Panevėžys (Lithuania)	Venantas Lašinis; Denas Masiulis; Valdas Šakūnas	— — — —
19–20 November 2021	Latvia; Panevėžys (Lithuania)	— — — —	— — — —
19–20 November 2021	Latvia; Panevėžys (Lithuania)	— — — —	— — — —
19–20 November 2021	Latvia; Panevėžys (Lithuania)	— — — —	— — — —
9–12 December 2021	Japan; Shizuoka	Yoshitaku Nagasako; Yuta Obara; Yudai Nitta	Fuko Umekawa; Yuka Kobayashi; Uta Kume
9–12 December 2021	Japan; Shizuoka	Kohei Terasaki; Koyu Matsui; Taketo Kikuchi	Yuno Ishigami; Mio Nakanishi; Ayaka Narumi
9–12 December 2021	Japan; Shizuoka	Kiaki Miura; Ryoya Mikami; Kyosuke Ito	— — —
13–16 December 2021	Malaysia; Nilai	Muhammad Ridwan Sahrom; Amar Danial Masri; Estiq Faiq Eiszaham	— — —
13–16 December 2021	Malaysia; Nilai	Muhammad Isyraq Mohzani; Mohamad Zakwan Hamidon; Ahmad Safwan Nazeri	— — —
13–16 December 2021	Malaysia; Nilai	Arfy Qhairant; Elmi Jumari; Muhammad Khairul Adha Rasol	— — —
24–28 December 2021	India; Jaipur	Jemsh Singh Keithellakpam; Yanglem Rojit Singh; Ronaldo Laitonjam	Shushikala Agashe; Mayuri Lute; Aditi Dongare
24–28 December 2021	India; Jaipur	Arkaprava Baul; Paul Collingwood; David Elkathchoongo	Celestina; Deborah Herold; Nisha Nikita
24–28 December 2021	India; Jaipur	J K Aswin; Mayur Pawar; Amarjeet Singh Nagi	Joyshree Gogoi; Chayanika Gogoi; Gongutri Bordoli
4 – 6 February 2022	Slovenia; Novo Mesto	Anže Skok; Žiga Jerman; Jernej Hribar	[[]]
4 – 6 February 2022	Slovenia; Novo Mesto	David Per; Aljaž Jarc; Žiga Horvat; Tilen Finkšt	[[]]
4 – 6 February 2022	Slovenia; Novo Mesto	Luka Ziherl; Jaka Vovk; Maks Cvjetičanin	[[]]
31 July 2022	United States; Breinigsville, Pennsylvania	James Alvord III; Andrew Chu; Barak Pipkins; Nicholas Roberts	Mandy Marquardt; Annika Flannigan; Divya Verma
31 July 2022	United States; Breinigsville, Pennsylvania	Ethan Boyes; Zachariah McClendon; Sandor Delgado	Skyler Espinoza; Jennifer Wagner; Emily Schelberg
31 July 2022	United States; Breinigsville, Pennsylvania	Erin Young; Dyllon Gunsolus; Andrew Carlberg	Christine D'Ercole; Camie Kornely; Lisa Nutter

===== Team Pursuit =====
Date	Venue	Podium (Men)	Podium (Women)
29–31 October 2021	Slovenia; Novo Mesto	David Per; Boštjan Murn; Kristjan Hočevar; Gal Glivar	— — — —
29–31 October 2021	Slovenia; Novo Mesto	Anže Skok; Jernej Hribar; Tilen Finkšt; Blaž Avbelj	— — — —
29–31 October 2021	Slovenia; Novo Mesto	Luka Ziherl; Jaka Vovk; Luka Vrhovnik; Matic Žumer	— — — —
18–21 November 2021	Brazil; Maringá	Kacio Fonseca; Armando Camargo; Endrigo Pereira; Patrick Oyakaua	Alice Melo; Wellyda Rodrigues; Ana Paula Finco; Márcia Fernandes
18–21 November 2021	Brazil; Maringá	Diego de Jesus; Fábio Dalamaria; Ricardo Dalamaria; Samuel Stachera; Cliff Furquim	Talita Oliveira; Gabriela Costa; Ana Paula Casetta; Thayná Araujo de Lima
18–21 November 2021	Brazil; Maringá	Joel Prado Júnior; Marcos Novello; Rafael Pattero; Diego Diesel	Ana Paula Polegatch; Luciene Ferreira da Silva; Larissa Castelari; Gabriela de Souza Gonçalves
19–20 November 2021	Lithuania; Panevėžys (Lithuania)	Venantas Lašinis; Justas Beniušis; Denas Masiulis; Valdas Šakūnas	— — — —
19–20 November 2021	Lithuania; Panevėžys (Lithuania)	Mindaugas Striška; Jokubas Zdanevičius; Darijus Džervus; Ramūnas Navardauskas	— — — —
19–20 November 2021	Lithuania; Panevėžys (Lithuania)	Aristidas Kelmelis; Mantas Januškevičius; Rokas Kmieliauskas; Aivaras Mikutis; Olegas Ivanovas	— — — —
19–20 November 2021	Latvia; Panevėžys (Lithuania)	— — — —	— — — —
19–20 November 2021	Latvia; Panevėžys (Lithuania)	— — — —	— — — —
19–20 November 2021	Latvia; Panevėžys (Lithuania)	— — — —	— — — —
9–12 December 2021	Japan; Shizuoka	Eiya Hashimoto; Shoki Kawano; Shunsuke Imamura; Naoki Kojima	Mio Taroda; Anna Iwamoto; Kasuga Watabe; Yui Ishida
9–12 December 2021	Japan; Shizuoka	Yoshihiro Tanase; Koshin Adachi; Daigo Hasegawa; Daichi Yamamoto	— — — —
9–12 December 2021	Japan; Shizuoka	Takato Koyata; Daichi Tomio; Ryo Tsudome; Hiroaki Harada	— — — —
13–16 December 2021	Malaysia; Nilai	—	Nur Aisyah Mohamad Zubir; Nor Aisyah Munirah Chek Ramli; Ezzatie Fifiyana Shazwanie Shaiful Hisham; Siti Nur Alia Mansor
13–16 December 2021	Malaysia; Nilai	—	Siti Nur Adibah Akma Mohd Fuad; Haziatul Eisya Suhardi; Nur Syafika Natasha Kadir; Noor Mastura Norman
13–16 December 2021	Malaysia; Nilai	—	—
18–19 December 2021	Czech Republic; Prague	Jan Voneš; Denis Rugovac; Nicolas Pietrula; Petr Vávra	Jarmila Machačová; Kateřina Kohoutková; Petra Ševčíková; Kristýna Burlová
18–19 December 2021	Czech Republic; Prague	Martin Čepek; Štěpán Široký; Adam Křenek; David Červíček; Martin Voltr	—
18–19 December 2021	Czech Republic; Prague	Milan Kadlec; Matyáš Koblížek; Pavel Novák; Radovan Štec	—
24–28 December 2021	India; Jaipur	Mula Ram; Manjeet Singh; Dinesh Kumar; Dinesh Kumar Jr. Sahil Kumar	Monorama Devi Tongbram; Sonali Chanu; Irom Matouleibi Devi; Amrita Raghunath G Alena Reji
24–28 December 2021	India; Jaipur	Rajbeer Singh; Anil Manglaw; Venkappa Kengalagutti; Naman Kapil; Vishavjeet Singh	Himanshi Singh; Mukul; Prabhjot Kaur; Rajbala Devi; Meenakshi Sharma
24–28 December 2021	India; Jaipur	Bhagirath Kalele; Mukesh Kaswan; Punam Chand; Ramkishan Bhadu; Ganeshram Beniwal	Jayashree Gogoi; Bristi Kongona Gogoi; Chayanika Gogoi; Gongutri Bordoloi
4 – 6 February 2022	Slovenia; Novo Mesto	Jaka Špoljar; David Per; Boštjan Murn; Tilen Finkšt; Nik Čemažar	[[]]
4 – 6 February 2022	Slovenia; Novo Mesto	Matic Žumer; Luka Vrhovnik; Marko Pavlič; Mihael Štajnar	[[]]
4 – 6 February 2022	Slovenia; Novo Mesto	Luka Ziherl; Jaka Vovk; Maks Cvjetičanin; Andrej Černe	[[]]

== See also ==
- 2007 in track cycling
- 2008 in track cycling
