= Jamie Alvord =

American track cyclist

James Alvord
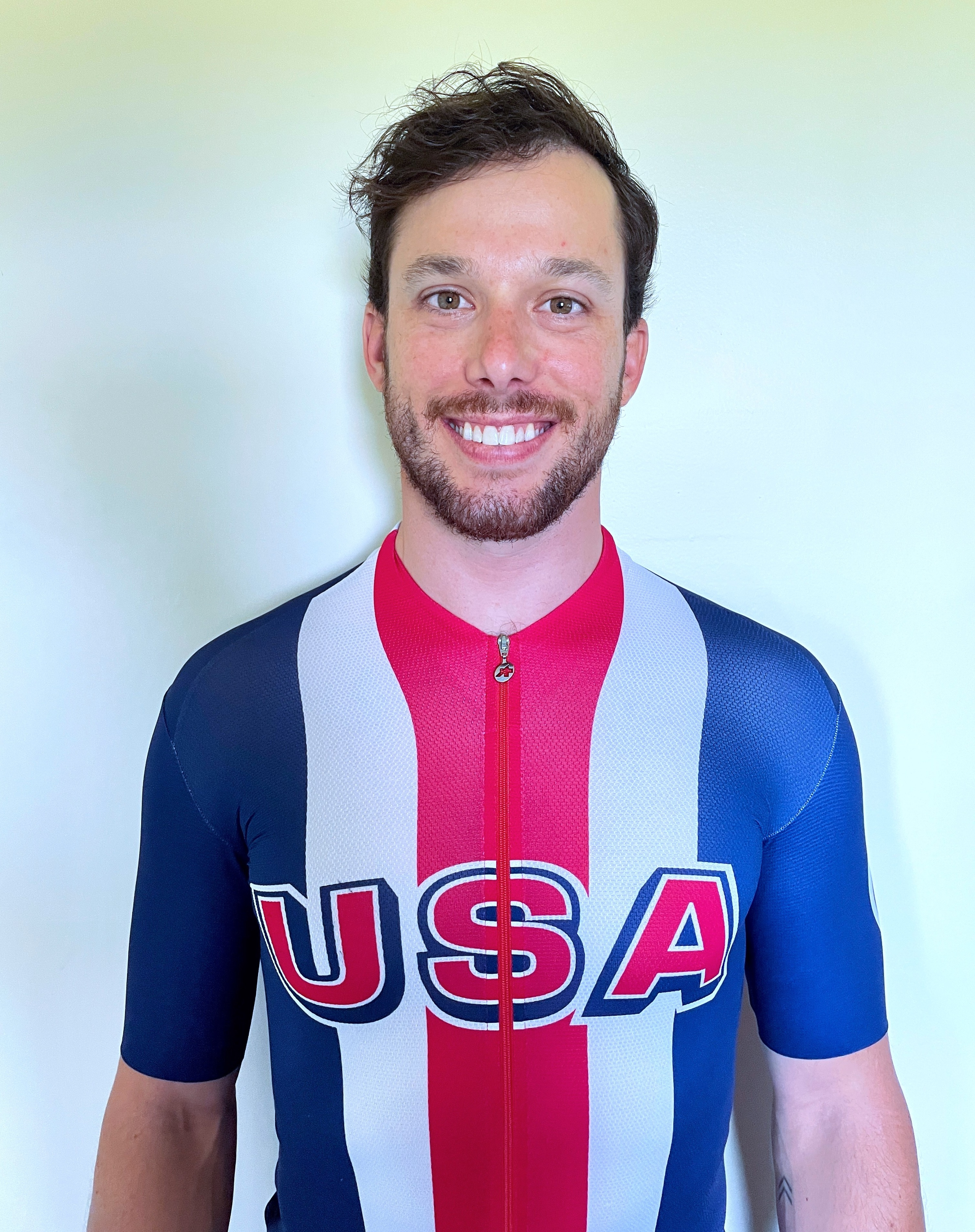

Personal information
- Full name: James Alvord III
- Nickname: Jamie
- Born: February 17, 1990 (age 36) Bryn Mawr, Pennsylvania
- Height: 5 ft 10 in (178 cm)

Cycling career
- Sport: Cycling
- Current team: Edge Cycling Team
- Discipline: Track cycling
- Rider type: Sprinter

James (Jamie) Alvord III (born February 17, 1990) is an American male sprint track cyclist, representing Edge Cycling Team. Alvord is a Pan American Continental Championship bronze medalist and a 10-time American National Champion. He holds USA Cycling National Champion titles in the sprint, Time Trial and Team sprint.

Alvord is married to 27-time National Champion Mandy Marquardt. The pair met in 2010 and started dating in 2012 when they both raced for Edge Cycling Team

Alvord competed in the 2021–22 UCI Track Cycling season and 2022–23 UCI Track Cycling season.

Alvord represented the United States at the 2023 Pan American Games, in Santiago, Chile. He finished 4th in the Men's Team Sprint.

He competed at the 2023 Track Pan American Continental Championships, in San Juan, Argentina. He finished 5th in the Men's Team Sprint and 8th in the Men's 1 km Time Trial. In 2024, Alvord represented the United States at the 2024 Track Pan American Continental Championships. Alvord, part of the Men's Team Sprint, secured a bronze medal.

== Career ==
Alvord took up cycling at a young age, following in the path of his father Jim, who was a competitive cyclist during the 1980s.

In 2010, Alvord finished third in the Men's Tandem Road Race, Blind/Visually Impaired at the USA Cycling 2010 Paralympic Road Nationals in Bend, Oregon. He was the captain for stoker Steve Baskis. In 2013, a month after breaking his scapula and three ribs, Alvord and teammate Leandro Bottasso of Argentina won Tandemonium.

Alvord won his first national title, in the Team Sprint, along with David Espinoza and James Mellen, at the 2016 United States National Track Championships. That same year, he competed at the Milton International Challenge p/b Lexus, a UCI CL1 event in Milton, Ontario, Canada.

In 2021, Alvord won the Sprint, Time Trial and Team Sprint titles at his home track, the Valley Preferred Cycling Center in Breinigsville, Pennsylvania. He added a UCI victory in the class 1 event, the T-Town Summer Games – Festival of Speed in the summer of 2021.

Alvord successfully defended his titles in the Sprint, Time Trial and Team Sprint events at the 2022 United States National Track Championships.

== Major results ==
;2014

3rd Scratch Race, United States National Track Championships
3rd Team Sprint with Andrew Carlberg and Jonathan Fraley, United States National Track Championships
4th Miss and Out, United States National Track Championships
2016
1st Team Sprint with David Espinoza and James Mellen, United States National Track Championships
3rd Keirin, United States National Track Championships
4th Sprint, United States National Track Championships
5th, Keirin, UCI CL1 – Milton International Challenge p/b Lexus
6th, Sprint, UCI CL1 – Milton International Challenge p/b Lexus
2017
2nd Team Sprint with James Mellen and Tommy Quinn, United States National Track Championships
2nd 1 km Time Trial, United States National Track Championships
4th Sprint, United States National Track Championships
5th Sprint, UCI CL1 – Easter International Cycling Grand Prix II
2018
2nd Team Sprint with James Mellen and Zachariah McClendon, United States National Track Championships
4th Sprint, United States National Track Championships
2021
1st Sprint, United States National Track Championships
1st 1 km Time Trial, United States National Track Championships
1st Team Sprint with Tommy Quinn, Geneway Tang and Andrew Chu, United States National Track Championships
1st Sprint, UCI CL1 – T-Town Summer Games – Festival of Speed
2022
1st Sprint, United States National Track Championships
1st 1 km Time Trial, United States National Track Championships
1st Team Sprint with Andrew Chu, Barak Pipkins, and Nicholas Roberts, United States National Track Championships
7th, 1 km Time Trial, Pan American Track Cycling Championships, Lima, Peru
2023
1st Sprint, United States National Track Championships
1st 1 km Time Trial, United States National Track Championships
1st Team Sprint with Evan Boone, Dalton Walters, and Jashua Hartman, United States National Track Championships
5th, Team Sprint, Pan American Track Cycling Championships, San Juan, Argentina
8th, 1 km Time Trial, Pan American Track Cycling Championships, San Juan, Argentina
