= Ethan Boyes =

American cyclist (1978–2023)

Personal information
- Born: October 23, 1978 Anchorage, Alaska, U.S.
- Died: April 4, 2023 (aged 44) Presidio of San Francisco, California, U.S.

Cycling career
- Sport: Cycling

Ethan Boyes (November 14, 1978 – April 4, 2023) was an American cyclist who was the holder of a national record for the "flying start".

== Early life and education ==
Boyes was born in Anchorage, Alaska, and had an older and a younger brother; the family later moved to North Carolina, where he studied culinary arts at Johnson & Wales University in Charlotte. He worked in the Virgin Islands, in Southern California, and in the Santa Barbara area as a sous-chef and a chef.

== Cycling career ==
Boyes moved to the San Francisco Bay Area in the early 2000s. He worked as a bicycle courier before entering competitive cycling, initially as a distance cyclist and then as a sprinter. He trained at Hellyer Park Velodrome in San Jose. He won ten USA Cycling national championships in track cycling, in 2015 set a world performance record for the 1,000-meter time trial in the 35–39 age group, and on September 24, 2018, set a national record of 26.461 seconds for the 500-meter track time trial flying start, both current as of April 2023. In 2022 he became Masters' Track World Champion in time trial and sprint in the 40–44 age group and was on the winning team sprint team.

A resident of San Francisco, Boyes died there on April 4, 2023, after a driver struck him while he was riding in the Presidio. He was 44.

== See also ==
- 2021–22 UCI Track Cycling season
- Deaths in 2023
- List of United States records in track cycling
