= Michelle Lauge Quaade =

Danish cyclist (born 1991)

Personal information
- Born: 18 May 1991 (age 35) Denmark

Cycling career
- Sport: Cycling
- Discipline: Road cycling

Michelle Lauge Quaade is a road cyclist from Denmark. She participated at the 2011 UCI Road World Championships.
