= Pernille Feldmann =

Norwegian cyclist

Personal information
- Full name: Pernille Larsen Feldmann
- Born: 1 February 2000 (age 26)

Cycling career
- Sport: Cycling
- Current team: Hitec Products–Fluid Control
- Discipline: Road
- Role: Rider

Professional team
- 2019–: Hitec Products–Birk Sport

Pernille Larsen Feldmann (born 1 February 2000) is a Norwegian professional racing cyclist, who currently rides for UCI Women's Continental Team Hitec Products–Fluid Control.
