= Christine D'Ercole =

Athlete and fitness instructor

- Born: August 11, 1971 (age 55)
- Education: Carnegie Mellon University
- Partner: Brian Hicks (married)
- Children: Victoria

Christine D’Ercole is a Masters World Champion track cyclist, Peloton fitness instructor, and public speaker.

== Career and education ==
D’Ercole grew up wanting to be a ballerina but was told that her thighs were too big. As a young adult, she wanted to work as a Broadway performer, choosing to attend a performing arts high school, followed by studying theater at Carnegie Mellon University. She used to ride her bike to classes.

After graduating from college, D’Ercole started auditioning for theater roles in New York City while working as a bartender and bike messenger to pay the bills. She became a part of the bike messenger community, who encouraged her to pursue track cycling and racing full-time.

While pursuing cycling, D’Ercole has also worked as a model and a fitness instructor. After teaching at SoulCycle and Equinox, she began working as a Peloton instructor in 2014.

D’Ercole has won the Masters World Championship in cycling and is a five-time National Champion. In 2021, she won 5 gold medals at the Masters Track National Championships, in the Points Race, Scratch Race, 2K Time Trial, Team Pursuit, and Team Sprint events. She is the only Peloton instructor who has won a world or national track cycling championship.

== Personal life ==
In 2019, D’Ercole was diagnosed with squamous cell carcinoma after noticing a spot on her nose. The surgery to remove the cancer was a success.

D’Ercole lives and works in Manhattan, and owns a Dutch Colonial house in Easton, Pennsylvania.

D’Ercole was in romantic relationships with women for many years and identified as gay. In 2021 she got engaged to a man she had met through a virtual Peloton class.
