= Zsófia Szabó =

Hungarian cyclist

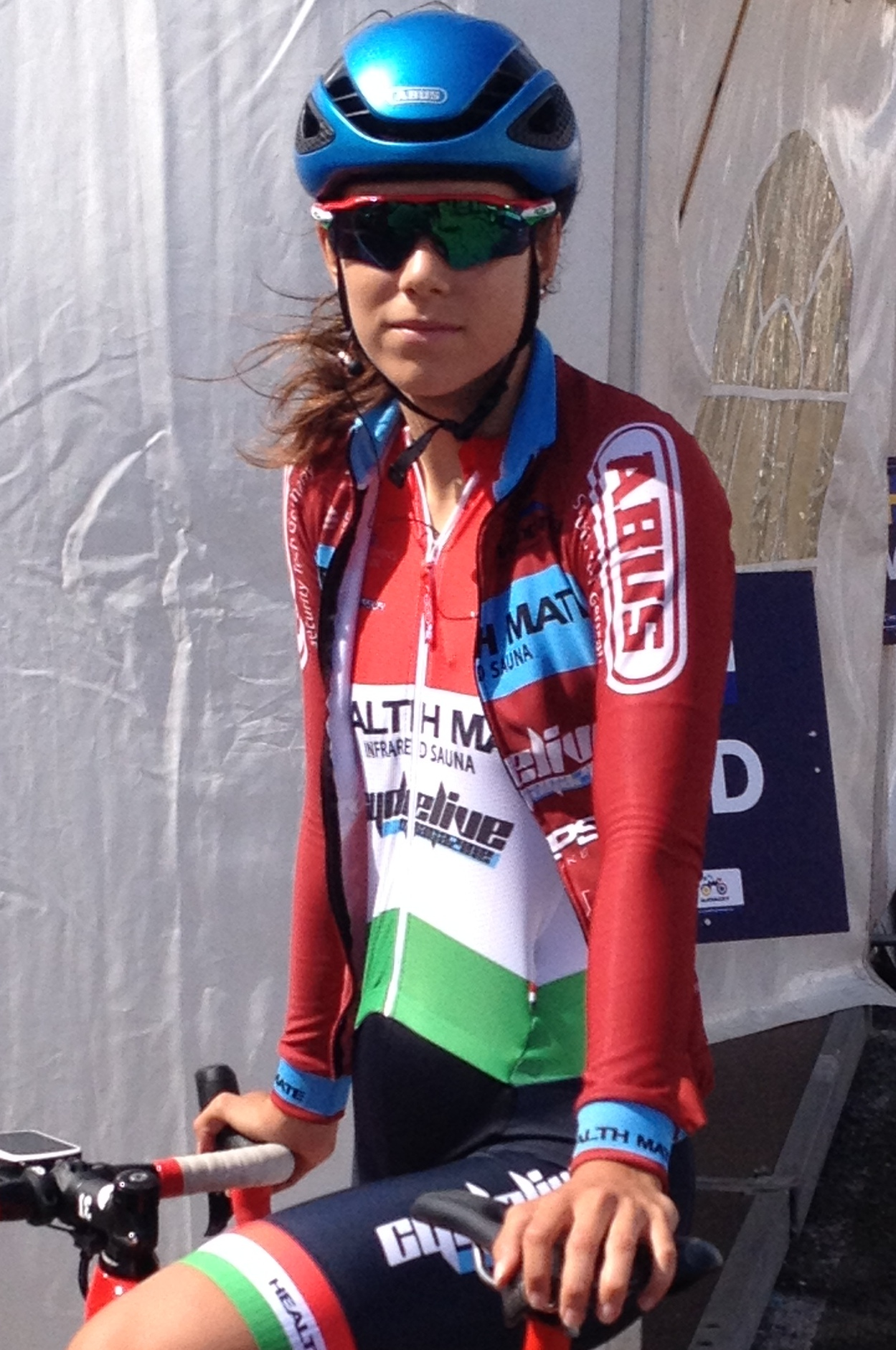
- Szabó in 2019

Personal information
- Full name: Zsófia Szabó
- Born: 3 January 1997 (age 29)

Cycling career
- Sport: Cycling
- Current team: Andy Schleck–CP NVST–Immo Losch
- Discipline: Road
- Role: Rider

Professional teams
- 2018–2019: Health Mate–Cyclelive Team
- 2020: Doltcini–Van Eyck Sport
- 2021–: Andy Schleck–CP NVST–Immo Losch

Zsófia Szabó (born 3 January 1997) is a Hungarian professional racing cyclist, who currently rides for UCI Women's Continental Team Andy Schleck–CP NVST–Immo Losch.
