= James Mellen =

American cyclist

Personal information
- Born: January 1, 1996 (age 30) Schnecksville, Pennsylvania, U.S.
- Height: 5 ft 10 in (178 cm)
- Weight: 198 lb (90 kg)

Cycling career
- Sport: Cycling
- Discipline: Track
- Role: Rider
- Rider type: Sprinter
Medal record
Men's track cycling
Representing the United States

James Mellen (born January 1, 1996, in Schnecksville, Pennsylvania) is an American sprint track cyclist representing the United States. Mellen is a current US National Record holder in the 200m Flying Time Trial and an 11-time US National Champion.

Mellen graduated cum laude from The Pennsylvania State University-Schreyer Honors College in 2018 with a degree in Biomedical Engineering.

== Career ==
In 2013 and 2014 James Mellen competed at the UCI Junior Track World Championships.

In 2015 Mellen won his first USA Cycling National Championship, in the team sprint with Matthew Baranoski and David Espinoza. The following year he won two titles, in Keirin and also in Team Sprint (with James Alvord and David Espinoza). In 2017 and 2019 was the National Champion in Sprint and [Keirin]. At the 2019 Pan American Championships he set a new national record of 9.598 seconds over 200 metres.

== Major results ==
2012

- US Junior National Track Champion – 500m Time Trial

2013

- US Junior National Track Champion – Sprint and Team Sprint (with Calan Farley and Tyler Nothstein)

2014

- US Junior National Track Champion – Team Sprint (with Dominic Suozzi and Edward Alex Horvet)

2015

- US National Track Champion – Team Sprint (with Matthew Baranoski and David Espinoza)

2016

- US National Track Champion – Keirin, Team Sprint (with James Alvord and David Espinoza)

2017

- US National Track Champion – Sprint, Keirin

2019

- US National Track Champion – Sprint, Keirin
